

303001–303100 

|-bgcolor=#E9E9E9
| 303001 ||  || — || November 19, 2003 || Kitt Peak || Spacewatch || — || align=right | 1.0 km || 
|-id=002 bgcolor=#E9E9E9
| 303002 ||  || — || November 19, 2003 || Kitt Peak || Spacewatch || — || align=right | 1.3 km || 
|-id=003 bgcolor=#E9E9E9
| 303003 ||  || — || November 20, 2003 || Socorro || LINEAR || — || align=right | 1.1 km || 
|-id=004 bgcolor=#E9E9E9
| 303004 ||  || — || November 20, 2003 || Socorro || LINEAR || — || align=right | 1.7 km || 
|-id=005 bgcolor=#E9E9E9
| 303005 ||  || — || November 20, 2003 || Socorro || LINEAR || — || align=right | 2.1 km || 
|-id=006 bgcolor=#fefefe
| 303006 ||  || — || November 16, 2003 || Catalina || CSS || NYS || align=right | 1.1 km || 
|-id=007 bgcolor=#E9E9E9
| 303007 ||  || — || November 18, 2003 || Palomar || NEAT || — || align=right | 1.1 km || 
|-id=008 bgcolor=#E9E9E9
| 303008 ||  || — || November 21, 2003 || Socorro || LINEAR || MAR || align=right | 1.5 km || 
|-id=009 bgcolor=#E9E9E9
| 303009 ||  || — || November 21, 2003 || Socorro || LINEAR || — || align=right | 1.3 km || 
|-id=010 bgcolor=#E9E9E9
| 303010 ||  || — || November 20, 2003 || Socorro || LINEAR || — || align=right | 1.2 km || 
|-id=011 bgcolor=#E9E9E9
| 303011 ||  || — || November 20, 2003 || Socorro || LINEAR || — || align=right | 2.0 km || 
|-id=012 bgcolor=#E9E9E9
| 303012 ||  || — || November 20, 2003 || Socorro || LINEAR || — || align=right | 1.8 km || 
|-id=013 bgcolor=#E9E9E9
| 303013 ||  || — || November 20, 2003 || Socorro || LINEAR || — || align=right | 1.8 km || 
|-id=014 bgcolor=#E9E9E9
| 303014 ||  || — || November 20, 2003 || Socorro || LINEAR || — || align=right | 2.0 km || 
|-id=015 bgcolor=#E9E9E9
| 303015 ||  || — || November 20, 2003 || Socorro || LINEAR || EUN || align=right | 2.3 km || 
|-id=016 bgcolor=#E9E9E9
| 303016 ||  || — || November 19, 2003 || Kitt Peak || Spacewatch || — || align=right | 1.5 km || 
|-id=017 bgcolor=#E9E9E9
| 303017 ||  || — || November 23, 2003 || Kitt Peak || Spacewatch || — || align=right | 1.3 km || 
|-id=018 bgcolor=#E9E9E9
| 303018 ||  || — || November 24, 2003 || Anderson Mesa || LONEOS || — || align=right | 1.7 km || 
|-id=019 bgcolor=#E9E9E9
| 303019 ||  || — || November 29, 2003 || Socorro || LINEAR || EUN || align=right | 1.4 km || 
|-id=020 bgcolor=#E9E9E9
| 303020 ||  || — || November 19, 2003 || Kitt Peak || Spacewatch || — || align=right data-sort-value="0.98" | 980 m || 
|-id=021 bgcolor=#E9E9E9
| 303021 ||  || — || November 20, 2003 || Kitt Peak || M. W. Buie || — || align=right data-sort-value="0.90" | 900 m || 
|-id=022 bgcolor=#E9E9E9
| 303022 ||  || — || November 19, 2003 || Anderson Mesa || LONEOS || — || align=right | 1.0 km || 
|-id=023 bgcolor=#E9E9E9
| 303023 || 2003 XC || — || December 1, 2003 || Nogales || Tenagra II Obs. || — || align=right | 4.0 km || 
|-id=024 bgcolor=#E9E9E9
| 303024 ||  || — || December 1, 2003 || Socorro || LINEAR || — || align=right | 1.2 km || 
|-id=025 bgcolor=#E9E9E9
| 303025 ||  || — || December 1, 2003 || Socorro || LINEAR || — || align=right | 1.3 km || 
|-id=026 bgcolor=#E9E9E9
| 303026 ||  || — || December 1, 2003 || Socorro || LINEAR || — || align=right | 2.5 km || 
|-id=027 bgcolor=#E9E9E9
| 303027 ||  || — || December 15, 2003 || Socorro || LINEAR || — || align=right | 1.5 km || 
|-id=028 bgcolor=#E9E9E9
| 303028 ||  || — || December 17, 2003 || Anderson Mesa || LONEOS || — || align=right | 1.4 km || 
|-id=029 bgcolor=#E9E9E9
| 303029 ||  || — || December 17, 2003 || Kitt Peak || Spacewatch || — || align=right | 1.1 km || 
|-id=030 bgcolor=#E9E9E9
| 303030 ||  || — || December 17, 2003 || Socorro || LINEAR || — || align=right | 1.8 km || 
|-id=031 bgcolor=#E9E9E9
| 303031 ||  || — || December 17, 2003 || Anderson Mesa || LONEOS || — || align=right | 1.9 km || 
|-id=032 bgcolor=#E9E9E9
| 303032 ||  || — || December 17, 2003 || Kitt Peak || Spacewatch || — || align=right | 1.2 km || 
|-id=033 bgcolor=#E9E9E9
| 303033 ||  || — || December 17, 2003 || Kitt Peak || Spacewatch || — || align=right | 1.4 km || 
|-id=034 bgcolor=#E9E9E9
| 303034 ||  || — || December 16, 2003 || Catalina || CSS || — || align=right | 1.1 km || 
|-id=035 bgcolor=#E9E9E9
| 303035 ||  || — || December 18, 2003 || Socorro || LINEAR || — || align=right | 1.9 km || 
|-id=036 bgcolor=#E9E9E9
| 303036 ||  || — || December 18, 2003 || Socorro || LINEAR || — || align=right data-sort-value="0.93" | 930 m || 
|-id=037 bgcolor=#E9E9E9
| 303037 ||  || — || December 19, 2003 || Kitt Peak || Spacewatch || — || align=right | 1.2 km || 
|-id=038 bgcolor=#E9E9E9
| 303038 ||  || — || December 19, 2003 || Haleakala || NEAT || — || align=right | 1.6 km || 
|-id=039 bgcolor=#E9E9E9
| 303039 ||  || — || December 19, 2003 || Kitt Peak || Spacewatch || — || align=right | 1.0 km || 
|-id=040 bgcolor=#E9E9E9
| 303040 ||  || — || December 17, 2003 || Socorro || LINEAR || RAF || align=right | 1.4 km || 
|-id=041 bgcolor=#E9E9E9
| 303041 ||  || — || December 19, 2003 || Socorro || LINEAR || — || align=right | 1.2 km || 
|-id=042 bgcolor=#E9E9E9
| 303042 ||  || — || December 19, 2003 || Kitt Peak || Spacewatch || — || align=right | 1.3 km || 
|-id=043 bgcolor=#E9E9E9
| 303043 ||  || — || December 19, 2003 || Socorro || LINEAR || RAF || align=right | 1.5 km || 
|-id=044 bgcolor=#E9E9E9
| 303044 ||  || — || December 19, 2003 || Socorro || LINEAR || — || align=right | 1.4 km || 
|-id=045 bgcolor=#E9E9E9
| 303045 ||  || — || December 18, 2003 || Socorro || LINEAR || — || align=right | 1.6 km || 
|-id=046 bgcolor=#E9E9E9
| 303046 ||  || — || December 18, 2003 || Socorro || LINEAR || — || align=right | 1.8 km || 
|-id=047 bgcolor=#E9E9E9
| 303047 ||  || — || December 18, 2003 || Socorro || LINEAR || — || align=right | 2.2 km || 
|-id=048 bgcolor=#E9E9E9
| 303048 ||  || — || December 19, 2003 || Kitt Peak || Spacewatch || — || align=right | 1.3 km || 
|-id=049 bgcolor=#E9E9E9
| 303049 ||  || — || December 21, 2003 || Needville || Needville Obs. || — || align=right | 3.8 km || 
|-id=050 bgcolor=#E9E9E9
| 303050 ||  || — || December 19, 2003 || Socorro || LINEAR || CLO || align=right | 3.1 km || 
|-id=051 bgcolor=#E9E9E9
| 303051 ||  || — || December 19, 2003 || Catalina || CSS || JUN || align=right | 2.0 km || 
|-id=052 bgcolor=#E9E9E9
| 303052 ||  || — || December 22, 2003 || Socorro || LINEAR || — || align=right | 1.7 km || 
|-id=053 bgcolor=#E9E9E9
| 303053 ||  || — || December 25, 2003 || Piszkéstető || K. Sárneczky || ADE || align=right | 2.1 km || 
|-id=054 bgcolor=#E9E9E9
| 303054 ||  || — || December 23, 2003 || Socorro || LINEAR || JUN || align=right | 1.2 km || 
|-id=055 bgcolor=#E9E9E9
| 303055 ||  || — || December 23, 2003 || Socorro || LINEAR || HNS || align=right | 1.8 km || 
|-id=056 bgcolor=#E9E9E9
| 303056 ||  || — || December 27, 2003 || Socorro || LINEAR || — || align=right | 1.6 km || 
|-id=057 bgcolor=#E9E9E9
| 303057 ||  || — || December 27, 2003 || Socorro || LINEAR || — || align=right | 2.2 km || 
|-id=058 bgcolor=#E9E9E9
| 303058 ||  || — || December 27, 2003 || Socorro || LINEAR || — || align=right | 1.8 km || 
|-id=059 bgcolor=#E9E9E9
| 303059 ||  || — || December 27, 2003 || Socorro || LINEAR || — || align=right | 4.9 km || 
|-id=060 bgcolor=#E9E9E9
| 303060 ||  || — || December 28, 2003 || Socorro || LINEAR || RAF || align=right data-sort-value="0.99" | 990 m || 
|-id=061 bgcolor=#E9E9E9
| 303061 ||  || — || December 28, 2003 || Socorro || LINEAR || — || align=right | 2.2 km || 
|-id=062 bgcolor=#E9E9E9
| 303062 ||  || — || December 28, 2003 || Socorro || LINEAR || RAF || align=right | 1.2 km || 
|-id=063 bgcolor=#E9E9E9
| 303063 ||  || — || December 28, 2003 || Socorro || LINEAR || — || align=right | 2.0 km || 
|-id=064 bgcolor=#E9E9E9
| 303064 ||  || — || December 28, 2003 || Socorro || LINEAR || EUN || align=right | 1.4 km || 
|-id=065 bgcolor=#E9E9E9
| 303065 ||  || — || December 28, 2003 || Socorro || LINEAR || — || align=right | 2.2 km || 
|-id=066 bgcolor=#E9E9E9
| 303066 ||  || — || December 29, 2003 || Catalina || CSS || — || align=right | 2.5 km || 
|-id=067 bgcolor=#E9E9E9
| 303067 ||  || — || December 29, 2003 || Catalina || CSS || EUN || align=right | 1.9 km || 
|-id=068 bgcolor=#E9E9E9
| 303068 ||  || — || December 29, 2003 || Catalina || CSS || EUN || align=right | 1.6 km || 
|-id=069 bgcolor=#E9E9E9
| 303069 ||  || — || December 29, 2003 || Catalina || CSS || — || align=right | 2.6 km || 
|-id=070 bgcolor=#E9E9E9
| 303070 ||  || — || December 29, 2003 || Socorro || LINEAR || — || align=right | 1.6 km || 
|-id=071 bgcolor=#E9E9E9
| 303071 ||  || — || December 29, 2003 || Socorro || LINEAR || — || align=right | 1.9 km || 
|-id=072 bgcolor=#E9E9E9
| 303072 ||  || — || December 30, 2003 || Socorro || LINEAR || — || align=right | 3.1 km || 
|-id=073 bgcolor=#E9E9E9
| 303073 ||  || — || December 30, 2003 || Socorro || LINEAR || JUN || align=right | 1.5 km || 
|-id=074 bgcolor=#E9E9E9
| 303074 ||  || — || December 17, 2003 || Socorro || LINEAR || — || align=right | 1.7 km || 
|-id=075 bgcolor=#E9E9E9
| 303075 ||  || — || December 18, 2003 || Socorro || LINEAR || — || align=right | 1.5 km || 
|-id=076 bgcolor=#E9E9E9
| 303076 ||  || — || December 19, 2003 || Kitt Peak || Spacewatch || — || align=right | 1.5 km || 
|-id=077 bgcolor=#E9E9E9
| 303077 ||  || — || December 19, 2003 || Kitt Peak || Spacewatch || — || align=right | 3.2 km || 
|-id=078 bgcolor=#E9E9E9
| 303078 ||  || — || December 22, 2003 || Palomar || NEAT || KAZ || align=right | 2.0 km || 
|-id=079 bgcolor=#FA8072
| 303079 ||  || — || January 3, 2004 || Socorro || LINEAR || — || align=right | 2.6 km || 
|-id=080 bgcolor=#E9E9E9
| 303080 ||  || — || January 12, 2004 || Palomar || NEAT || — || align=right | 1.7 km || 
|-id=081 bgcolor=#E9E9E9
| 303081 ||  || — || January 11, 2004 || Palomar || NEAT || — || align=right | 3.7 km || 
|-id=082 bgcolor=#E9E9E9
| 303082 ||  || — || January 13, 2004 || Anderson Mesa || LONEOS || — || align=right | 1.2 km || 
|-id=083 bgcolor=#E9E9E9
| 303083 ||  || — || December 19, 2003 || Kitt Peak || Spacewatch || — || align=right | 1.9 km || 
|-id=084 bgcolor=#E9E9E9
| 303084 ||  || — || January 15, 2004 || Kitt Peak || Spacewatch || — || align=right | 2.0 km || 
|-id=085 bgcolor=#E9E9E9
| 303085 ||  || — || January 16, 2004 || Kitt Peak || Spacewatch || — || align=right | 1.4 km || 
|-id=086 bgcolor=#E9E9E9
| 303086 ||  || — || January 17, 2004 || Palomar || NEAT || — || align=right | 3.8 km || 
|-id=087 bgcolor=#E9E9E9
| 303087 ||  || — || January 17, 2004 || Palomar || NEAT || EUN || align=right | 1.6 km || 
|-id=088 bgcolor=#E9E9E9
| 303088 ||  || — || January 16, 2004 || Palomar || NEAT || — || align=right | 1.6 km || 
|-id=089 bgcolor=#E9E9E9
| 303089 ||  || — || January 16, 2004 || Kitt Peak || Spacewatch || — || align=right | 2.7 km || 
|-id=090 bgcolor=#E9E9E9
| 303090 ||  || — || January 17, 2004 || Palomar || NEAT || — || align=right | 2.3 km || 
|-id=091 bgcolor=#E9E9E9
| 303091 ||  || — || January 18, 2004 || Kitt Peak || Spacewatch || ADE || align=right | 3.0 km || 
|-id=092 bgcolor=#E9E9E9
| 303092 ||  || — || January 19, 2004 || Sandlot || Sandlot Obs. || — || align=right | 1.6 km || 
|-id=093 bgcolor=#E9E9E9
| 303093 ||  || — || January 19, 2004 || Kitt Peak || Spacewatch || HEN || align=right | 1.5 km || 
|-id=094 bgcolor=#E9E9E9
| 303094 ||  || — || January 19, 2004 || Kitt Peak || Spacewatch || — || align=right | 2.0 km || 
|-id=095 bgcolor=#E9E9E9
| 303095 ||  || — || January 22, 2004 || Socorro || LINEAR || — || align=right | 2.8 km || 
|-id=096 bgcolor=#E9E9E9
| 303096 ||  || — || January 22, 2004 || Socorro || LINEAR || WIT || align=right | 1.2 km || 
|-id=097 bgcolor=#E9E9E9
| 303097 ||  || — || January 23, 2004 || Socorro || LINEAR || — || align=right | 1.9 km || 
|-id=098 bgcolor=#E9E9E9
| 303098 ||  || — || January 21, 2004 || Socorro || LINEAR || — || align=right | 2.4 km || 
|-id=099 bgcolor=#E9E9E9
| 303099 ||  || — || January 23, 2004 || Socorro || LINEAR || JUN || align=right | 1.4 km || 
|-id=100 bgcolor=#E9E9E9
| 303100 ||  || — || January 25, 2004 || Haleakala || NEAT || JUN || align=right | 1.5 km || 
|}

303101–303200 

|-bgcolor=#E9E9E9
| 303101 ||  || — || January 27, 2004 || Anderson Mesa || LONEOS || — || align=right | 3.3 km || 
|-id=102 bgcolor=#E9E9E9
| 303102 ||  || — || January 24, 2004 || Socorro || LINEAR || — || align=right | 1.3 km || 
|-id=103 bgcolor=#E9E9E9
| 303103 ||  || — || January 28, 2004 || Catalina || CSS || — || align=right | 3.3 km || 
|-id=104 bgcolor=#E9E9E9
| 303104 ||  || — || January 28, 2004 || Catalina || CSS || — || align=right | 2.2 km || 
|-id=105 bgcolor=#E9E9E9
| 303105 ||  || — || January 28, 2004 || Catalina || CSS || — || align=right | 2.3 km || 
|-id=106 bgcolor=#E9E9E9
| 303106 ||  || — || January 31, 2004 || Socorro || LINEAR || — || align=right | 2.3 km || 
|-id=107 bgcolor=#E9E9E9
| 303107 ||  || — || January 31, 2004 || Socorro || LINEAR || — || align=right | 2.3 km || 
|-id=108 bgcolor=#E9E9E9
| 303108 ||  || — || January 19, 2004 || Kitt Peak || Spacewatch || — || align=right | 1.2 km || 
|-id=109 bgcolor=#E9E9E9
| 303109 ||  || — || January 19, 2004 || Kitt Peak || Spacewatch || — || align=right | 1.8 km || 
|-id=110 bgcolor=#E9E9E9
| 303110 ||  || — || January 19, 2004 || Kitt Peak || Spacewatch || — || align=right | 1.8 km || 
|-id=111 bgcolor=#E9E9E9
| 303111 ||  || — || January 18, 2004 || Palomar || NEAT || EUN || align=right | 1.8 km || 
|-id=112 bgcolor=#E9E9E9
| 303112 ||  || — || January 27, 2004 || Kitt Peak || Spacewatch || — || align=right | 1.6 km || 
|-id=113 bgcolor=#E9E9E9
| 303113 ||  || — || January 16, 2004 || Palomar || NEAT || JUN || align=right | 1.5 km || 
|-id=114 bgcolor=#E9E9E9
| 303114 ||  || — || February 9, 2004 || Palomar || NEAT || — || align=right | 2.0 km || 
|-id=115 bgcolor=#E9E9E9
| 303115 ||  || — || February 12, 2004 || Goodricke-Pigott || Goodricke-Pigott Obs. || DOR || align=right | 3.7 km || 
|-id=116 bgcolor=#E9E9E9
| 303116 ||  || — || February 10, 2004 || Palomar || NEAT || — || align=right | 3.1 km || 
|-id=117 bgcolor=#E9E9E9
| 303117 ||  || — || February 11, 2004 || Kitt Peak || Spacewatch || — || align=right | 1.7 km || 
|-id=118 bgcolor=#E9E9E9
| 303118 ||  || — || February 11, 2004 || Kitt Peak || Spacewatch || — || align=right | 1.5 km || 
|-id=119 bgcolor=#E9E9E9
| 303119 ||  || — || February 12, 2004 || Kitt Peak || Spacewatch || — || align=right | 2.2 km || 
|-id=120 bgcolor=#E9E9E9
| 303120 ||  || — || February 12, 2004 || Kitt Peak || Spacewatch || — || align=right | 2.0 km || 
|-id=121 bgcolor=#E9E9E9
| 303121 ||  || — || February 12, 2004 || Kitt Peak || Spacewatch || — || align=right | 2.7 km || 
|-id=122 bgcolor=#E9E9E9
| 303122 ||  || — || February 13, 2004 || Kitt Peak || Spacewatch || — || align=right | 2.5 km || 
|-id=123 bgcolor=#E9E9E9
| 303123 ||  || — || February 14, 2004 || Nogales || Tenagra II Obs. || HOF || align=right | 2.8 km || 
|-id=124 bgcolor=#E9E9E9
| 303124 ||  || — || February 10, 2004 || Palomar || NEAT || — || align=right | 1.4 km || 
|-id=125 bgcolor=#E9E9E9
| 303125 ||  || — || February 11, 2004 || Palomar || NEAT || — || align=right | 3.7 km || 
|-id=126 bgcolor=#E9E9E9
| 303126 ||  || — || February 13, 2004 || Palomar || NEAT || JUN || align=right | 1.3 km || 
|-id=127 bgcolor=#E9E9E9
| 303127 ||  || — || February 11, 2004 || Palomar || NEAT || EUN || align=right | 1.5 km || 
|-id=128 bgcolor=#E9E9E9
| 303128 ||  || — || February 12, 2004 || Kitt Peak || Spacewatch || — || align=right | 2.5 km || 
|-id=129 bgcolor=#E9E9E9
| 303129 ||  || — || February 11, 2004 || Kitt Peak || Spacewatch || — || align=right | 1.7 km || 
|-id=130 bgcolor=#E9E9E9
| 303130 ||  || — || February 13, 2004 || Palomar || NEAT || — || align=right | 2.2 km || 
|-id=131 bgcolor=#E9E9E9
| 303131 ||  || — || February 14, 2004 || Palomar || NEAT || — || align=right | 1.7 km || 
|-id=132 bgcolor=#E9E9E9
| 303132 ||  || — || February 14, 2004 || Haleakala || NEAT || — || align=right | 2.1 km || 
|-id=133 bgcolor=#E9E9E9
| 303133 ||  || — || February 12, 2004 || Palomar || NEAT || — || align=right | 2.3 km || 
|-id=134 bgcolor=#E9E9E9
| 303134 ||  || — || February 14, 2004 || Kitt Peak || Spacewatch || — || align=right | 2.2 km || 
|-id=135 bgcolor=#E9E9E9
| 303135 ||  || — || February 14, 2004 || Kitt Peak || Spacewatch || — || align=right | 2.2 km || 
|-id=136 bgcolor=#E9E9E9
| 303136 ||  || — || February 13, 2004 || Anderson Mesa || LONEOS || EUN || align=right | 1.7 km || 
|-id=137 bgcolor=#E9E9E9
| 303137 ||  || — || February 13, 2004 || Anderson Mesa || LONEOS || — || align=right | 2.3 km || 
|-id=138 bgcolor=#E9E9E9
| 303138 ||  || — || February 12, 2004 || Palomar || NEAT || — || align=right | 2.9 km || 
|-id=139 bgcolor=#E9E9E9
| 303139 ||  || — || February 18, 2004 || Desert Eagle || W. K. Y. Yeung || — || align=right | 3.0 km || 
|-id=140 bgcolor=#E9E9E9
| 303140 ||  || — || February 17, 2004 || Palomar || NEAT || — || align=right | 2.9 km || 
|-id=141 bgcolor=#E9E9E9
| 303141 ||  || — || February 19, 2004 || Socorro || LINEAR || — || align=right | 1.9 km || 
|-id=142 bgcolor=#FA8072
| 303142 ||  || — || February 19, 2004 || Socorro || LINEAR || — || align=right | 1.9 km || 
|-id=143 bgcolor=#E9E9E9
| 303143 ||  || — || February 18, 2004 || Haleakala || NEAT || — || align=right | 3.3 km || 
|-id=144 bgcolor=#E9E9E9
| 303144 ||  || — || February 18, 2004 || Haleakala || NEAT || — || align=right | 4.3 km || 
|-id=145 bgcolor=#E9E9E9
| 303145 ||  || — || February 19, 2004 || Socorro || LINEAR || — || align=right | 1.6 km || 
|-id=146 bgcolor=#E9E9E9
| 303146 ||  || — || February 25, 2004 || Socorro || LINEAR || AEO || align=right | 1.7 km || 
|-id=147 bgcolor=#E9E9E9
| 303147 ||  || — || February 22, 2004 || Kitt Peak || Spacewatch || AGN || align=right | 1.1 km || 
|-id=148 bgcolor=#E9E9E9
| 303148 ||  || — || February 26, 2004 || Kitt Peak || M. W. Buie || GEF || align=right | 1.8 km || 
|-id=149 bgcolor=#E9E9E9
| 303149 ||  || — || February 26, 2004 || Kitt Peak || M. W. Buie || — || align=right | 2.4 km || 
|-id=150 bgcolor=#E9E9E9
| 303150 ||  || — || February 18, 2004 || Kitt Peak || Spacewatch || JUN || align=right | 1.2 km || 
|-id=151 bgcolor=#E9E9E9
| 303151 ||  || — || March 13, 2004 || Palomar || NEAT || GEF || align=right | 1.6 km || 
|-id=152 bgcolor=#d6d6d6
| 303152 ||  || — || March 11, 2004 || Palomar || NEAT || BRA || align=right | 2.1 km || 
|-id=153 bgcolor=#E9E9E9
| 303153 ||  || — || March 14, 2004 || Kitt Peak || Spacewatch || — || align=right | 3.2 km || 
|-id=154 bgcolor=#E9E9E9
| 303154 ||  || — || March 15, 2004 || Črni Vrh || Črni Vrh || — || align=right | 2.2 km || 
|-id=155 bgcolor=#E9E9E9
| 303155 ||  || — || March 15, 2004 || Kitt Peak || Spacewatch || — || align=right | 2.0 km || 
|-id=156 bgcolor=#E9E9E9
| 303156 ||  || — || March 12, 2004 || Palomar || NEAT || — || align=right | 2.9 km || 
|-id=157 bgcolor=#E9E9E9
| 303157 ||  || — || March 13, 2004 || Palomar || NEAT || — || align=right | 2.6 km || 
|-id=158 bgcolor=#E9E9E9
| 303158 ||  || — || March 15, 2004 || Kitt Peak || Spacewatch || WIT || align=right | 1.4 km || 
|-id=159 bgcolor=#E9E9E9
| 303159 ||  || — || March 15, 2004 || Palomar || NEAT || — || align=right | 4.5 km || 
|-id=160 bgcolor=#E9E9E9
| 303160 ||  || — || March 15, 2004 || Palomar || NEAT || — || align=right | 3.0 km || 
|-id=161 bgcolor=#E9E9E9
| 303161 ||  || — || March 15, 2004 || Palomar || NEAT || — || align=right | 3.1 km || 
|-id=162 bgcolor=#E9E9E9
| 303162 ||  || — || March 12, 2004 || Palomar || NEAT || MRX || align=right | 1.1 km || 
|-id=163 bgcolor=#E9E9E9
| 303163 ||  || — || March 15, 2004 || Socorro || LINEAR || — || align=right | 2.0 km || 
|-id=164 bgcolor=#E9E9E9
| 303164 ||  || — || March 15, 2004 || Kitt Peak || Spacewatch || — || align=right | 2.5 km || 
|-id=165 bgcolor=#E9E9E9
| 303165 ||  || — || March 15, 2004 || Kitt Peak || Spacewatch || — || align=right | 3.2 km || 
|-id=166 bgcolor=#E9E9E9
| 303166 ||  || — || March 15, 2004 || Catalina || CSS || — || align=right | 3.0 km || 
|-id=167 bgcolor=#E9E9E9
| 303167 ||  || — || March 15, 2004 || Socorro || LINEAR || — || align=right | 3.2 km || 
|-id=168 bgcolor=#E9E9E9
| 303168 ||  || — || March 15, 2004 || Kitt Peak || Spacewatch || — || align=right | 1.9 km || 
|-id=169 bgcolor=#E9E9E9
| 303169 ||  || — || March 14, 2004 || Kitt Peak || Spacewatch || HEN || align=right | 1.3 km || 
|-id=170 bgcolor=#E9E9E9
| 303170 ||  || — || March 15, 2004 || Kitt Peak || Spacewatch || — || align=right | 3.1 km || 
|-id=171 bgcolor=#E9E9E9
| 303171 ||  || — || March 15, 2004 || Socorro || LINEAR || — || align=right | 3.0 km || 
|-id=172 bgcolor=#d6d6d6
| 303172 ||  || — || March 15, 2004 || Kitt Peak || Spacewatch || — || align=right | 2.3 km || 
|-id=173 bgcolor=#E9E9E9
| 303173 ||  || — || March 16, 2004 || Socorro || LINEAR || JUN || align=right | 1.6 km || 
|-id=174 bgcolor=#FFC2E0
| 303174 ||  || — || March 23, 2004 || Socorro || LINEAR || AMO +1km || align=right | 1.5 km || 
|-id=175 bgcolor=#E9E9E9
| 303175 ||  || — || March 17, 2004 || Kitt Peak || Spacewatch || AGN || align=right | 1.4 km || 
|-id=176 bgcolor=#E9E9E9
| 303176 ||  || — || March 17, 2004 || Kitt Peak || Spacewatch || — || align=right | 3.0 km || 
|-id=177 bgcolor=#d6d6d6
| 303177 ||  || — || March 29, 2004 || Kleť || Kleť Obs. || 615 || align=right | 1.9 km || 
|-id=178 bgcolor=#E9E9E9
| 303178 ||  || — || March 16, 2004 || Kitt Peak || Spacewatch || — || align=right | 3.5 km || 
|-id=179 bgcolor=#d6d6d6
| 303179 ||  || — || March 17, 2004 || Kitt Peak || Spacewatch || KOR || align=right | 1.9 km || 
|-id=180 bgcolor=#E9E9E9
| 303180 ||  || — || March 17, 2004 || Kitt Peak || Spacewatch || WIT || align=right | 1.1 km || 
|-id=181 bgcolor=#E9E9E9
| 303181 ||  || — || March 19, 2004 || Socorro || LINEAR || — || align=right | 3.0 km || 
|-id=182 bgcolor=#E9E9E9
| 303182 ||  || — || March 17, 2004 || Kitt Peak || Spacewatch || AGN || align=right | 1.2 km || 
|-id=183 bgcolor=#E9E9E9
| 303183 ||  || — || March 17, 2004 || Kitt Peak || Spacewatch || — || align=right | 2.5 km || 
|-id=184 bgcolor=#E9E9E9
| 303184 ||  || — || March 18, 2004 || Palomar || NEAT || — || align=right | 3.0 km || 
|-id=185 bgcolor=#E9E9E9
| 303185 ||  || — || March 20, 2004 || Siding Spring || SSS || GAL || align=right | 2.5 km || 
|-id=186 bgcolor=#E9E9E9
| 303186 ||  || — || March 19, 2004 || Palomar || NEAT || — || align=right | 2.3 km || 
|-id=187 bgcolor=#E9E9E9
| 303187 ||  || — || March 23, 2004 || Socorro || LINEAR || — || align=right | 2.8 km || 
|-id=188 bgcolor=#fefefe
| 303188 ||  || — || March 23, 2004 || Socorro || LINEAR || — || align=right data-sort-value="0.79" | 790 m || 
|-id=189 bgcolor=#E9E9E9
| 303189 ||  || — || March 23, 2004 || Kitt Peak || Spacewatch || — || align=right | 2.3 km || 
|-id=190 bgcolor=#d6d6d6
| 303190 ||  || — || March 23, 2004 || Socorro || LINEAR || — || align=right | 3.6 km || 
|-id=191 bgcolor=#d6d6d6
| 303191 ||  || — || March 27, 2004 || Kitt Peak || Spacewatch || TIR || align=right | 4.8 km || 
|-id=192 bgcolor=#d6d6d6
| 303192 ||  || — || March 31, 2004 || Kitt Peak || Spacewatch || — || align=right | 2.4 km || 
|-id=193 bgcolor=#E9E9E9
| 303193 ||  || — || March 29, 2004 || Socorro || LINEAR || — || align=right | 4.6 km || 
|-id=194 bgcolor=#d6d6d6
| 303194 ||  || — || March 16, 2004 || Catalina || CSS || — || align=right | 2.9 km || 
|-id=195 bgcolor=#E9E9E9
| 303195 ||  || — || April 12, 2004 || Reedy Creek || J. Broughton || — || align=right | 2.7 km || 
|-id=196 bgcolor=#E9E9E9
| 303196 ||  || — || April 13, 2004 || Catalina || CSS || — || align=right | 4.2 km || 
|-id=197 bgcolor=#d6d6d6
| 303197 ||  || — || April 11, 2004 || Palomar || NEAT || — || align=right | 3.6 km || 
|-id=198 bgcolor=#d6d6d6
| 303198 ||  || — || April 12, 2004 || Siding Spring || SSS || — || align=right | 4.7 km || 
|-id=199 bgcolor=#E9E9E9
| 303199 ||  || — || April 12, 2004 || Kitt Peak || Spacewatch || — || align=right | 2.5 km || 
|-id=200 bgcolor=#d6d6d6
| 303200 ||  || — || April 12, 2004 || Kitt Peak || Spacewatch || 628 || align=right | 2.2 km || 
|}

303201–303300 

|-bgcolor=#d6d6d6
| 303201 ||  || — || April 13, 2004 || Kitt Peak || Spacewatch || — || align=right | 2.6 km || 
|-id=202 bgcolor=#d6d6d6
| 303202 ||  || — || April 13, 2004 || Kitt Peak || Spacewatch || 628 || align=right | 1.9 km || 
|-id=203 bgcolor=#d6d6d6
| 303203 ||  || — || April 13, 2004 || Catalina || CSS || TIR || align=right | 3.8 km || 
|-id=204 bgcolor=#E9E9E9
| 303204 ||  || — || April 15, 2004 || Socorro || LINEAR || GAL || align=right | 2.2 km || 
|-id=205 bgcolor=#d6d6d6
| 303205 ||  || — || April 14, 2004 || Palomar || NEAT || — || align=right | 5.2 km || 
|-id=206 bgcolor=#E9E9E9
| 303206 ||  || — || April 19, 2004 || Kitt Peak || Spacewatch || MRX || align=right | 1.4 km || 
|-id=207 bgcolor=#d6d6d6
| 303207 ||  || — || April 17, 2004 || Kitt Peak || Spacewatch || — || align=right | 2.5 km || 
|-id=208 bgcolor=#d6d6d6
| 303208 ||  || — || April 22, 2004 || Kitt Peak || Spacewatch || — || align=right | 2.6 km || 
|-id=209 bgcolor=#E9E9E9
| 303209 ||  || — || April 23, 2004 || Socorro || LINEAR || — || align=right | 4.5 km || 
|-id=210 bgcolor=#d6d6d6
| 303210 ||  || — || April 24, 2004 || Kitt Peak || Spacewatch || — || align=right | 2.7 km || 
|-id=211 bgcolor=#d6d6d6
| 303211 ||  || — || April 23, 2004 || Socorro || LINEAR || EUP || align=right | 3.9 km || 
|-id=212 bgcolor=#d6d6d6
| 303212 ||  || — || May 12, 2004 || Catalina || CSS || — || align=right | 3.0 km || 
|-id=213 bgcolor=#d6d6d6
| 303213 ||  || — || May 9, 2004 || Kitt Peak || Spacewatch || BRA || align=right | 1.9 km || 
|-id=214 bgcolor=#d6d6d6
| 303214 ||  || — || May 9, 2004 || Kitt Peak || Spacewatch || — || align=right | 3.2 km || 
|-id=215 bgcolor=#d6d6d6
| 303215 ||  || — || May 15, 2004 || Socorro || LINEAR || TIR || align=right | 2.5 km || 
|-id=216 bgcolor=#d6d6d6
| 303216 ||  || — || May 15, 2004 || Socorro || LINEAR || THB || align=right | 4.5 km || 
|-id=217 bgcolor=#d6d6d6
| 303217 ||  || — || May 13, 2004 || Kitt Peak || Spacewatch || — || align=right | 2.8 km || 
|-id=218 bgcolor=#d6d6d6
| 303218 ||  || — || May 17, 2004 || Reedy Creek || J. Broughton || — || align=right | 3.8 km || 
|-id=219 bgcolor=#d6d6d6
| 303219 ||  || — || May 19, 2004 || Kitt Peak || Spacewatch || — || align=right | 3.4 km || 
|-id=220 bgcolor=#d6d6d6
| 303220 ||  || — || June 21, 2004 || Socorro || LINEAR || ALA || align=right | 5.7 km || 
|-id=221 bgcolor=#fefefe
| 303221 || 2004 NC || — || July 6, 2004 || Campo Imperatore || CINEOS || — || align=right data-sort-value="0.83" | 830 m || 
|-id=222 bgcolor=#fefefe
| 303222 ||  || — || July 7, 2004 || Campo Imperatore || CINEOS || — || align=right data-sort-value="0.99" | 990 m || 
|-id=223 bgcolor=#fefefe
| 303223 ||  || — || July 10, 2004 || Catalina || CSS || — || align=right | 1.2 km || 
|-id=224 bgcolor=#fefefe
| 303224 ||  || — || July 14, 2004 || Socorro || LINEAR || — || align=right data-sort-value="0.67" | 670 m || 
|-id=225 bgcolor=#d6d6d6
| 303225 ||  || — || July 14, 2004 || Siding Spring || SSS || — || align=right | 4.9 km || 
|-id=226 bgcolor=#d6d6d6
| 303226 ||  || — || July 9, 2004 || Anderson Mesa || LONEOS || Tj (2.9) || align=right | 7.1 km || 
|-id=227 bgcolor=#fefefe
| 303227 ||  || — || July 15, 2004 || Socorro || LINEAR || — || align=right data-sort-value="0.65" | 650 m || 
|-id=228 bgcolor=#fefefe
| 303228 ||  || — || July 16, 2004 || Socorro || LINEAR || FLO || align=right data-sort-value="0.58" | 580 m || 
|-id=229 bgcolor=#fefefe
| 303229 ||  || — || July 18, 2004 || Socorro || LINEAR || — || align=right | 1.0 km || 
|-id=230 bgcolor=#fefefe
| 303230 ||  || — || August 6, 2004 || Palomar || NEAT || — || align=right data-sort-value="0.87" | 870 m || 
|-id=231 bgcolor=#fefefe
| 303231 ||  || — || August 8, 2004 || Socorro || LINEAR || FLO || align=right data-sort-value="0.61" | 610 m || 
|-id=232 bgcolor=#fefefe
| 303232 ||  || — || August 8, 2004 || Palomar || NEAT || — || align=right data-sort-value="0.77" | 770 m || 
|-id=233 bgcolor=#fefefe
| 303233 ||  || — || August 8, 2004 || Socorro || LINEAR || — || align=right data-sort-value="0.46" | 460 m || 
|-id=234 bgcolor=#fefefe
| 303234 ||  || — || August 8, 2004 || Anderson Mesa || LONEOS || — || align=right data-sort-value="0.83" | 830 m || 
|-id=235 bgcolor=#fefefe
| 303235 ||  || — || August 9, 2004 || Anderson Mesa || LONEOS || — || align=right data-sort-value="0.84" | 840 m || 
|-id=236 bgcolor=#fefefe
| 303236 ||  || — || August 9, 2004 || Socorro || LINEAR || — || align=right | 1.0 km || 
|-id=237 bgcolor=#fefefe
| 303237 ||  || — || August 8, 2004 || Socorro || LINEAR || — || align=right data-sort-value="0.73" | 730 m || 
|-id=238 bgcolor=#d6d6d6
| 303238 ||  || — || August 8, 2004 || Socorro || LINEAR || 7:4 || align=right | 5.0 km || 
|-id=239 bgcolor=#fefefe
| 303239 ||  || — || August 8, 2004 || Anderson Mesa || LONEOS || — || align=right data-sort-value="0.91" | 910 m || 
|-id=240 bgcolor=#fefefe
| 303240 ||  || — || August 6, 2004 || Campo Imperatore || CINEOS || — || align=right data-sort-value="0.74" | 740 m || 
|-id=241 bgcolor=#fefefe
| 303241 ||  || — || August 11, 2004 || Socorro || LINEAR || — || align=right data-sort-value="0.83" | 830 m || 
|-id=242 bgcolor=#fefefe
| 303242 ||  || — || August 12, 2004 || Socorro || LINEAR || FLO || align=right data-sort-value="0.78" | 780 m || 
|-id=243 bgcolor=#fefefe
| 303243 ||  || — || August 10, 2004 || Socorro || LINEAR || — || align=right | 1.0 km || 
|-id=244 bgcolor=#FA8072
| 303244 ||  || — || August 19, 2004 || Modra || Modra Obs. || — || align=right | 1.1 km || 
|-id=245 bgcolor=#fefefe
| 303245 ||  || — || August 19, 2004 || Siding Spring || SSS || — || align=right | 1.1 km || 
|-id=246 bgcolor=#fefefe
| 303246 ||  || — || August 21, 2004 || Siding Spring || SSS || — || align=right data-sort-value="0.83" | 830 m || 
|-id=247 bgcolor=#fefefe
| 303247 ||  || — || August 21, 2004 || Siding Spring || SSS || V || align=right data-sort-value="0.85" | 850 m || 
|-id=248 bgcolor=#FFC2E0
| 303248 ||  || — || August 25, 2004 || Anderson Mesa || LONEOS || APO +1km || align=right data-sort-value="0.82" | 820 m || 
|-id=249 bgcolor=#fefefe
| 303249 ||  || — || August 26, 2004 || Goodricke-Pigott || R. A. Tucker || — || align=right | 1.1 km || 
|-id=250 bgcolor=#FFC2E0
| 303250 ||  || — || September 7, 2004 || Socorro || LINEAR || ATE +1km || align=right data-sort-value="0.85" | 850 m || 
|-id=251 bgcolor=#fefefe
| 303251 ||  || — || September 7, 2004 || Kitt Peak || Spacewatch || — || align=right data-sort-value="0.91" | 910 m || 
|-id=252 bgcolor=#fefefe
| 303252 ||  || — || September 7, 2004 || Kitt Peak || Spacewatch || — || align=right data-sort-value="0.64" | 640 m || 
|-id=253 bgcolor=#fefefe
| 303253 ||  || — || September 7, 2004 || Socorro || LINEAR || — || align=right data-sort-value="0.85" | 850 m || 
|-id=254 bgcolor=#fefefe
| 303254 ||  || — || September 8, 2004 || Socorro || LINEAR || NYS || align=right data-sort-value="0.68" | 680 m || 
|-id=255 bgcolor=#fefefe
| 303255 ||  || — || September 8, 2004 || Socorro || LINEAR || — || align=right data-sort-value="0.82" | 820 m || 
|-id=256 bgcolor=#fefefe
| 303256 ||  || — || September 8, 2004 || Socorro || LINEAR || — || align=right data-sort-value="0.89" | 890 m || 
|-id=257 bgcolor=#fefefe
| 303257 ||  || — || September 8, 2004 || Socorro || LINEAR || V || align=right data-sort-value="0.84" | 840 m || 
|-id=258 bgcolor=#fefefe
| 303258 ||  || — || September 8, 2004 || Socorro || LINEAR || — || align=right data-sort-value="0.87" | 870 m || 
|-id=259 bgcolor=#fefefe
| 303259 ||  || — || September 8, 2004 || Socorro || LINEAR || NYS || align=right data-sort-value="0.80" | 800 m || 
|-id=260 bgcolor=#fefefe
| 303260 ||  || — || September 8, 2004 || Socorro || LINEAR || V || align=right data-sort-value="0.92" | 920 m || 
|-id=261 bgcolor=#fefefe
| 303261 ||  || — || September 7, 2004 || Socorro || LINEAR || PHO || align=right | 1.2 km || 
|-id=262 bgcolor=#FFC2E0
| 303262 ||  || — || September 10, 2004 || Socorro || LINEAR || APO || align=right data-sort-value="0.66" | 660 m || 
|-id=263 bgcolor=#fefefe
| 303263 ||  || — || September 8, 2004 || Socorro || LINEAR || — || align=right data-sort-value="0.89" | 890 m || 
|-id=264 bgcolor=#fefefe
| 303264 ||  || — || September 8, 2004 || Palomar || NEAT || — || align=right data-sort-value="0.92" | 920 m || 
|-id=265 bgcolor=#fefefe
| 303265 Littmann ||  ||  || September 8, 2004 || Wrightwood || J. W. Young || V || align=right data-sort-value="0.73" | 730 m || 
|-id=266 bgcolor=#fefefe
| 303266 ||  || — || September 7, 2004 || Kitt Peak || Spacewatch || — || align=right data-sort-value="0.84" | 840 m || 
|-id=267 bgcolor=#fefefe
| 303267 ||  || — || September 8, 2004 || Campo Imperatore || CINEOS || — || align=right data-sort-value="0.78" | 780 m || 
|-id=268 bgcolor=#fefefe
| 303268 ||  || — || September 8, 2004 || Socorro || LINEAR || — || align=right | 1.0 km || 
|-id=269 bgcolor=#fefefe
| 303269 ||  || — || September 10, 2004 || Socorro || LINEAR || FLO || align=right data-sort-value="0.72" | 720 m || 
|-id=270 bgcolor=#fefefe
| 303270 ||  || — || September 10, 2004 || Socorro || LINEAR || FLO || align=right data-sort-value="0.70" | 700 m || 
|-id=271 bgcolor=#fefefe
| 303271 ||  || — || September 8, 2004 || Socorro || LINEAR || FLO || align=right | 1.2 km || 
|-id=272 bgcolor=#fefefe
| 303272 ||  || — || September 8, 2004 || Palomar || NEAT || — || align=right data-sort-value="0.85" | 850 m || 
|-id=273 bgcolor=#fefefe
| 303273 ||  || — || September 9, 2004 || Socorro || LINEAR || — || align=right data-sort-value="0.89" | 890 m || 
|-id=274 bgcolor=#fefefe
| 303274 ||  || — || September 10, 2004 || Socorro || LINEAR || — || align=right data-sort-value="0.83" | 830 m || 
|-id=275 bgcolor=#fefefe
| 303275 ||  || — || September 10, 2004 || Socorro || LINEAR || — || align=right | 1.1 km || 
|-id=276 bgcolor=#fefefe
| 303276 ||  || — || September 10, 2004 || Socorro || LINEAR || — || align=right | 1.2 km || 
|-id=277 bgcolor=#fefefe
| 303277 ||  || — || September 10, 2004 || Socorro || LINEAR || V || align=right data-sort-value="0.84" | 840 m || 
|-id=278 bgcolor=#fefefe
| 303278 ||  || — || September 10, 2004 || Socorro || LINEAR || — || align=right data-sort-value="0.92" | 920 m || 
|-id=279 bgcolor=#fefefe
| 303279 ||  || — || September 10, 2004 || Socorro || LINEAR || V || align=right data-sort-value="0.95" | 950 m || 
|-id=280 bgcolor=#fefefe
| 303280 ||  || — || September 10, 2004 || Socorro || LINEAR || — || align=right data-sort-value="0.96" | 960 m || 
|-id=281 bgcolor=#fefefe
| 303281 ||  || — || September 9, 2004 || Kitt Peak || Spacewatch || FLO || align=right data-sort-value="0.78" | 780 m || 
|-id=282 bgcolor=#fefefe
| 303282 ||  || — || September 14, 2004 || Palomar || NEAT || NYS || align=right data-sort-value="0.66" | 660 m || 
|-id=283 bgcolor=#fefefe
| 303283 ||  || — || September 10, 2004 || Kitt Peak || Spacewatch || — || align=right data-sort-value="0.69" | 690 m || 
|-id=284 bgcolor=#fefefe
| 303284 ||  || — || September 11, 2004 || Kitt Peak || Spacewatch || FLO || align=right data-sort-value="0.59" | 590 m || 
|-id=285 bgcolor=#fefefe
| 303285 ||  || — || September 13, 2004 || Palomar || NEAT || — || align=right | 2.7 km || 
|-id=286 bgcolor=#fefefe
| 303286 ||  || — || September 15, 2004 || Kitt Peak || Spacewatch || — || align=right | 1.1 km || 
|-id=287 bgcolor=#fefefe
| 303287 ||  || — || September 15, 2004 || Kitt Peak || Spacewatch || — || align=right data-sort-value="0.96" | 960 m || 
|-id=288 bgcolor=#fefefe
| 303288 ||  || — || September 15, 2004 || Kitt Peak || Spacewatch || NYS || align=right data-sort-value="0.74" | 740 m || 
|-id=289 bgcolor=#d6d6d6
| 303289 ||  || — || September 15, 2004 || Kitt Peak || Spacewatch || SYL7:4 || align=right | 5.2 km || 
|-id=290 bgcolor=#fefefe
| 303290 ||  || — || September 14, 2004 || Anderson Mesa || LONEOS || NYS || align=right data-sort-value="0.67" | 670 m || 
|-id=291 bgcolor=#fefefe
| 303291 ||  || — || September 7, 2004 || Socorro || LINEAR || V || align=right data-sort-value="0.74" | 740 m || 
|-id=292 bgcolor=#fefefe
| 303292 ||  || — || September 17, 2004 || Socorro || LINEAR || — || align=right data-sort-value="0.79" | 790 m || 
|-id=293 bgcolor=#fefefe
| 303293 ||  || — || September 17, 2004 || Kitt Peak || Spacewatch || FLO || align=right data-sort-value="0.70" | 700 m || 
|-id=294 bgcolor=#fefefe
| 303294 ||  || — || September 17, 2004 || Socorro || LINEAR || — || align=right data-sort-value="0.86" | 860 m || 
|-id=295 bgcolor=#fefefe
| 303295 ||  || — || September 17, 2004 || Anderson Mesa || LONEOS || — || align=right data-sort-value="0.78" | 780 m || 
|-id=296 bgcolor=#fefefe
| 303296 ||  || — || September 17, 2004 || Anderson Mesa || LONEOS || — || align=right | 1.0 km || 
|-id=297 bgcolor=#fefefe
| 303297 ||  || — || September 17, 2004 || Anderson Mesa || LONEOS || — || align=right | 1.0 km || 
|-id=298 bgcolor=#fefefe
| 303298 ||  || — || September 17, 2004 || Kitt Peak || Spacewatch || — || align=right | 1.2 km || 
|-id=299 bgcolor=#fefefe
| 303299 ||  || — || September 17, 2004 || Socorro || LINEAR || — || align=right | 1.1 km || 
|-id=300 bgcolor=#fefefe
| 303300 ||  || — || September 23, 2004 || Kitt Peak || Spacewatch || FLO || align=right data-sort-value="0.62" | 620 m || 
|}

303301–303400 

|-bgcolor=#fefefe
| 303301 ||  || — || October 4, 2004 || Kitt Peak || Spacewatch || NYS || align=right data-sort-value="0.66" | 660 m || 
|-id=302 bgcolor=#fefefe
| 303302 ||  || — || October 5, 2004 || Kitt Peak || Spacewatch || FLO || align=right data-sort-value="0.61" | 610 m || 
|-id=303 bgcolor=#fefefe
| 303303 ||  || — || October 9, 2004 || Socorro || LINEAR || — || align=right data-sort-value="0.94" | 940 m || 
|-id=304 bgcolor=#fefefe
| 303304 ||  || — || October 11, 2004 || Moletai || K. Černis, J. Zdanavičius || FLO || align=right | 1.1 km || 
|-id=305 bgcolor=#fefefe
| 303305 ||  || — || October 13, 2004 || Goodricke-Pigott || R. A. Tucker || FLO || align=right data-sort-value="0.85" | 850 m || 
|-id=306 bgcolor=#fefefe
| 303306 ||  || — || October 4, 2004 || Kitt Peak || Spacewatch || — || align=right data-sort-value="0.84" | 840 m || 
|-id=307 bgcolor=#fefefe
| 303307 ||  || — || October 4, 2004 || Kitt Peak || Spacewatch || V || align=right | 2.3 km || 
|-id=308 bgcolor=#fefefe
| 303308 ||  || — || October 4, 2004 || Kitt Peak || Spacewatch || MAS || align=right data-sort-value="0.75" | 750 m || 
|-id=309 bgcolor=#fefefe
| 303309 ||  || — || October 4, 2004 || Kitt Peak || Spacewatch || — || align=right | 1.1 km || 
|-id=310 bgcolor=#fefefe
| 303310 ||  || — || October 4, 2004 || Kitt Peak || Spacewatch || NYS || align=right data-sort-value="0.70" | 700 m || 
|-id=311 bgcolor=#d6d6d6
| 303311 ||  || — || October 4, 2004 || Kitt Peak || Spacewatch || SYL7:4 || align=right | 5.8 km || 
|-id=312 bgcolor=#fefefe
| 303312 ||  || — || October 4, 2004 || Kitt Peak || Spacewatch || — || align=right data-sort-value="0.81" | 810 m || 
|-id=313 bgcolor=#fefefe
| 303313 ||  || — || October 4, 2004 || Kitt Peak || Spacewatch || V || align=right data-sort-value="0.80" | 800 m || 
|-id=314 bgcolor=#fefefe
| 303314 ||  || — || October 4, 2004 || Kitt Peak || Spacewatch || NYS || align=right data-sort-value="0.80" | 800 m || 
|-id=315 bgcolor=#fefefe
| 303315 ||  || — || October 5, 2004 || Kitt Peak || Spacewatch || — || align=right data-sort-value="0.96" | 960 m || 
|-id=316 bgcolor=#fefefe
| 303316 ||  || — || October 5, 2004 || Anderson Mesa || LONEOS || — || align=right data-sort-value="0.83" | 830 m || 
|-id=317 bgcolor=#fefefe
| 303317 ||  || — || October 6, 2004 || Kitt Peak || Spacewatch || FLO || align=right data-sort-value="0.79" | 790 m || 
|-id=318 bgcolor=#fefefe
| 303318 ||  || — || October 6, 2004 || Kitt Peak || Spacewatch || V || align=right data-sort-value="0.78" | 780 m || 
|-id=319 bgcolor=#fefefe
| 303319 ||  || — || October 4, 2004 || Kitt Peak || Spacewatch || FLO || align=right data-sort-value="0.94" | 940 m || 
|-id=320 bgcolor=#fefefe
| 303320 ||  || — || October 5, 2004 || Kitt Peak || Spacewatch || — || align=right | 1.0 km || 
|-id=321 bgcolor=#fefefe
| 303321 ||  || — || October 5, 2004 || Kitt Peak || Spacewatch || — || align=right | 1.0 km || 
|-id=322 bgcolor=#fefefe
| 303322 ||  || — || October 5, 2004 || Kitt Peak || Spacewatch || V || align=right data-sort-value="0.73" | 730 m || 
|-id=323 bgcolor=#fefefe
| 303323 ||  || — || October 5, 2004 || Kitt Peak || Spacewatch || V || align=right data-sort-value="0.76" | 760 m || 
|-id=324 bgcolor=#fefefe
| 303324 ||  || — || October 7, 2004 || Anderson Mesa || LONEOS || — || align=right | 2.4 km || 
|-id=325 bgcolor=#fefefe
| 303325 ||  || — || October 7, 2004 || Kitt Peak || Spacewatch || FLO || align=right data-sort-value="0.58" | 580 m || 
|-id=326 bgcolor=#fefefe
| 303326 ||  || — || October 7, 2004 || Anderson Mesa || LONEOS || — || align=right | 1.0 km || 
|-id=327 bgcolor=#fefefe
| 303327 ||  || — || October 7, 2004 || Socorro || LINEAR || PHO || align=right | 2.8 km || 
|-id=328 bgcolor=#fefefe
| 303328 ||  || — || October 7, 2004 || Palomar || NEAT || V || align=right | 1.0 km || 
|-id=329 bgcolor=#fefefe
| 303329 ||  || — || October 6, 2004 || Socorro || LINEAR || FLO || align=right data-sort-value="0.70" | 700 m || 
|-id=330 bgcolor=#fefefe
| 303330 ||  || — || October 6, 2004 || Palomar || NEAT || FLO || align=right data-sort-value="0.70" | 700 m || 
|-id=331 bgcolor=#fefefe
| 303331 ||  || — || October 7, 2004 || Anderson Mesa || LONEOS || V || align=right data-sort-value="0.67" | 670 m || 
|-id=332 bgcolor=#fefefe
| 303332 ||  || — || October 7, 2004 || Anderson Mesa || LONEOS || NYS || align=right data-sort-value="0.76" | 760 m || 
|-id=333 bgcolor=#fefefe
| 303333 ||  || — || October 7, 2004 || Anderson Mesa || LONEOS || FLO || align=right data-sort-value="0.94" | 940 m || 
|-id=334 bgcolor=#fefefe
| 303334 ||  || — || October 4, 2004 || Kitt Peak || Spacewatch || — || align=right data-sort-value="0.83" | 830 m || 
|-id=335 bgcolor=#fefefe
| 303335 ||  || — || October 4, 2004 || Kitt Peak || Spacewatch || — || align=right | 1.0 km || 
|-id=336 bgcolor=#fefefe
| 303336 ||  || — || October 6, 2004 || Kitt Peak || Spacewatch || — || align=right | 1.2 km || 
|-id=337 bgcolor=#fefefe
| 303337 ||  || — || October 6, 2004 || Kitt Peak || Spacewatch || V || align=right data-sort-value="0.94" | 940 m || 
|-id=338 bgcolor=#fefefe
| 303338 ||  || — || October 8, 2004 || Socorro || LINEAR || — || align=right | 1.2 km || 
|-id=339 bgcolor=#fefefe
| 303339 ||  || — || October 7, 2004 || Kitt Peak || Spacewatch || — || align=right data-sort-value="0.91" | 910 m || 
|-id=340 bgcolor=#fefefe
| 303340 ||  || — || October 7, 2004 || Kitt Peak || Spacewatch || — || align=right | 1.4 km || 
|-id=341 bgcolor=#fefefe
| 303341 ||  || — || October 8, 2004 || Kitt Peak || Spacewatch || — || align=right data-sort-value="0.79" | 790 m || 
|-id=342 bgcolor=#fefefe
| 303342 ||  || — || October 8, 2004 || Kitt Peak || Spacewatch || V || align=right data-sort-value="0.59" | 590 m || 
|-id=343 bgcolor=#fefefe
| 303343 ||  || — || October 8, 2004 || Kitt Peak || Spacewatch || — || align=right data-sort-value="0.99" | 990 m || 
|-id=344 bgcolor=#fefefe
| 303344 ||  || — || October 8, 2004 || Kitt Peak || Spacewatch || — || align=right | 1.3 km || 
|-id=345 bgcolor=#fefefe
| 303345 ||  || — || October 7, 2004 || Socorro || LINEAR || V || align=right data-sort-value="0.95" | 950 m || 
|-id=346 bgcolor=#fefefe
| 303346 ||  || — || October 7, 2004 || Socorro || LINEAR || — || align=right | 1.1 km || 
|-id=347 bgcolor=#fefefe
| 303347 ||  || — || October 7, 2004 || Kitt Peak || Spacewatch || — || align=right | 1.1 km || 
|-id=348 bgcolor=#fefefe
| 303348 ||  || — || October 7, 2004 || Kitt Peak || Spacewatch || V || align=right data-sort-value="0.91" | 910 m || 
|-id=349 bgcolor=#fefefe
| 303349 ||  || — || October 9, 2004 || Kitt Peak || Spacewatch || FLO || align=right data-sort-value="0.94" | 940 m || 
|-id=350 bgcolor=#fefefe
| 303350 ||  || — || October 10, 2004 || Kitt Peak || Spacewatch || FLO || align=right data-sort-value="0.58" | 580 m || 
|-id=351 bgcolor=#fefefe
| 303351 ||  || — || October 10, 2004 || Kitt Peak || Spacewatch || MAS || align=right data-sort-value="0.65" | 650 m || 
|-id=352 bgcolor=#fefefe
| 303352 ||  || — || October 13, 2004 || Kitt Peak || Spacewatch || FLO || align=right data-sort-value="0.68" | 680 m || 
|-id=353 bgcolor=#fefefe
| 303353 ||  || — || October 13, 2004 || Kitt Peak || Spacewatch || V || align=right data-sort-value="0.89" | 890 m || 
|-id=354 bgcolor=#fefefe
| 303354 ||  || — || October 3, 2004 || Palomar || NEAT || V || align=right data-sort-value="0.81" | 810 m || 
|-id=355 bgcolor=#fefefe
| 303355 ||  || — || October 9, 2004 || Socorro || LINEAR || — || align=right | 1.1 km || 
|-id=356 bgcolor=#fefefe
| 303356 ||  || — || October 9, 2004 || Kitt Peak || Spacewatch || FLO || align=right data-sort-value="0.60" | 600 m || 
|-id=357 bgcolor=#fefefe
| 303357 ||  || — || October 15, 2004 || Socorro || LINEAR || FLO || align=right data-sort-value="0.91" | 910 m || 
|-id=358 bgcolor=#fefefe
| 303358 ||  || — || October 15, 2004 || Anderson Mesa || LONEOS || FLO || align=right data-sort-value="0.94" | 940 m || 
|-id=359 bgcolor=#fefefe
| 303359 ||  || — || October 7, 2004 || Socorro || LINEAR || PHO || align=right | 1.2 km || 
|-id=360 bgcolor=#fefefe
| 303360 ||  || — || October 9, 2004 || Socorro || LINEAR || — || align=right data-sort-value="0.77" | 770 m || 
|-id=361 bgcolor=#fefefe
| 303361 ||  || — || October 15, 2004 || Mount Lemmon || Mount Lemmon Survey || FLO || align=right data-sort-value="0.70" | 700 m || 
|-id=362 bgcolor=#fefefe
| 303362 ||  || — || October 21, 2004 || Socorro || LINEAR || V || align=right data-sort-value="0.85" | 850 m || 
|-id=363 bgcolor=#fefefe
| 303363 ||  || — || October 23, 2004 || Goodricke-Pigott || Goodricke-Pigott Obs. || — || align=right data-sort-value="0.77" | 770 m || 
|-id=364 bgcolor=#fefefe
| 303364 ||  || — || November 3, 2004 || Anderson Mesa || LONEOS || — || align=right data-sort-value="0.94" | 940 m || 
|-id=365 bgcolor=#fefefe
| 303365 ||  || — || November 3, 2004 || Palomar || NEAT || — || align=right data-sort-value="0.97" | 970 m || 
|-id=366 bgcolor=#fefefe
| 303366 ||  || — || November 4, 2004 || Catalina || CSS || — || align=right | 1.3 km || 
|-id=367 bgcolor=#fefefe
| 303367 ||  || — || November 5, 2004 || Campo Imperatore || CINEOS || — || align=right | 1.1 km || 
|-id=368 bgcolor=#fefefe
| 303368 ||  || — || November 5, 2004 || Palomar || NEAT || ERI || align=right | 3.1 km || 
|-id=369 bgcolor=#fefefe
| 303369 ||  || — || November 4, 2004 || Catalina || CSS || FLO || align=right data-sort-value="0.94" | 940 m || 
|-id=370 bgcolor=#fefefe
| 303370 ||  || — || November 7, 2004 || Socorro || LINEAR || PHO || align=right | 1.2 km || 
|-id=371 bgcolor=#fefefe
| 303371 ||  || — || November 4, 2004 || Kitt Peak || Spacewatch || PHO || align=right | 1.9 km || 
|-id=372 bgcolor=#fefefe
| 303372 ||  || — || November 4, 2004 || Kitt Peak || Spacewatch || NYS || align=right data-sort-value="0.78" | 780 m || 
|-id=373 bgcolor=#fefefe
| 303373 ||  || — || November 7, 2004 || Socorro || LINEAR || — || align=right data-sort-value="0.90" | 900 m || 
|-id=374 bgcolor=#fefefe
| 303374 ||  || — || November 4, 2004 || Catalina || CSS || V || align=right data-sort-value="0.91" | 910 m || 
|-id=375 bgcolor=#fefefe
| 303375 ||  || — || November 10, 2004 || Kitt Peak || Spacewatch || V || align=right | 1.2 km || 
|-id=376 bgcolor=#fefefe
| 303376 ||  || — || November 11, 2004 || Kitt Peak || Spacewatch || FLO || align=right data-sort-value="0.91" | 910 m || 
|-id=377 bgcolor=#fefefe
| 303377 ||  || — || November 17, 2004 || Campo Imperatore || CINEOS || — || align=right data-sort-value="0.97" | 970 m || 
|-id=378 bgcolor=#fefefe
| 303378 ||  || — || November 18, 2004 || Socorro || LINEAR || — || align=right | 1.0 km || 
|-id=379 bgcolor=#fefefe
| 303379 ||  || — || December 1, 2004 || Palomar || NEAT || — || align=right | 1.0 km || 
|-id=380 bgcolor=#fefefe
| 303380 ||  || — || December 2, 2004 || Palomar || NEAT || V || align=right data-sort-value="0.79" | 790 m || 
|-id=381 bgcolor=#fefefe
| 303381 ||  || — || December 2, 2004 || Catalina || CSS || V || align=right data-sort-value="0.83" | 830 m || 
|-id=382 bgcolor=#fefefe
| 303382 ||  || — || December 8, 2004 || Socorro || LINEAR || NYS || align=right | 1.0 km || 
|-id=383 bgcolor=#fefefe
| 303383 ||  || — || December 10, 2004 || Socorro || LINEAR || NYS || align=right data-sort-value="0.88" | 880 m || 
|-id=384 bgcolor=#fefefe
| 303384 ||  || — || December 10, 2004 || Socorro || LINEAR || — || align=right | 1.3 km || 
|-id=385 bgcolor=#fefefe
| 303385 ||  || — || December 10, 2004 || Socorro || LINEAR || — || align=right | 1.3 km || 
|-id=386 bgcolor=#fefefe
| 303386 ||  || — || December 2, 2004 || Catalina || CSS || V || align=right | 1.0 km || 
|-id=387 bgcolor=#fefefe
| 303387 ||  || — || December 9, 2004 || Catalina || CSS || — || align=right | 1.3 km || 
|-id=388 bgcolor=#fefefe
| 303388 ||  || — || December 9, 2004 || Kitt Peak || Spacewatch || NYS || align=right data-sort-value="0.79" | 790 m || 
|-id=389 bgcolor=#fefefe
| 303389 ||  || — || December 10, 2004 || Kitt Peak || Spacewatch || NYS || align=right data-sort-value="0.85" | 850 m || 
|-id=390 bgcolor=#fefefe
| 303390 ||  || — || December 10, 2004 || Kitt Peak || Spacewatch || — || align=right | 1.6 km || 
|-id=391 bgcolor=#E9E9E9
| 303391 ||  || — || December 10, 2004 || Kitt Peak || Spacewatch || — || align=right | 1.5 km || 
|-id=392 bgcolor=#fefefe
| 303392 ||  || — || December 10, 2004 || Socorro || LINEAR || — || align=right data-sort-value="0.95" | 950 m || 
|-id=393 bgcolor=#fefefe
| 303393 ||  || — || December 11, 2004 || Socorro || LINEAR || NYS || align=right data-sort-value="0.95" | 950 m || 
|-id=394 bgcolor=#fefefe
| 303394 ||  || — || December 10, 2004 || Kitt Peak || Spacewatch || — || align=right | 1.4 km || 
|-id=395 bgcolor=#fefefe
| 303395 ||  || — || December 11, 2004 || Kitt Peak || Spacewatch || V || align=right data-sort-value="0.95" | 950 m || 
|-id=396 bgcolor=#fefefe
| 303396 ||  || — || December 11, 2004 || Kitt Peak || Spacewatch || — || align=right data-sort-value="0.89" | 890 m || 
|-id=397 bgcolor=#fefefe
| 303397 ||  || — || December 10, 2004 || Kitt Peak || Spacewatch || — || align=right | 1.1 km || 
|-id=398 bgcolor=#fefefe
| 303398 ||  || — || December 9, 2004 || Kitt Peak || Spacewatch || — || align=right data-sort-value="0.89" | 890 m || 
|-id=399 bgcolor=#fefefe
| 303399 ||  || — || December 11, 2004 || Socorro || LINEAR || FLO || align=right data-sort-value="0.99" | 990 m || 
|-id=400 bgcolor=#fefefe
| 303400 ||  || — || December 12, 2004 || Socorro || LINEAR || — || align=right | 1.2 km || 
|}

303401–303500 

|-bgcolor=#fefefe
| 303401 ||  || — || December 14, 2004 || Anderson Mesa || LONEOS || NYS || align=right data-sort-value="0.64" | 640 m || 
|-id=402 bgcolor=#fefefe
| 303402 ||  || — || December 12, 2004 || Kitt Peak || Spacewatch || — || align=right data-sort-value="0.87" | 870 m || 
|-id=403 bgcolor=#fefefe
| 303403 ||  || — || December 12, 2004 || Kitt Peak || Spacewatch || — || align=right | 1.1 km || 
|-id=404 bgcolor=#fefefe
| 303404 ||  || — || December 13, 2004 || Kitt Peak || Spacewatch || NYS || align=right | 1.1 km || 
|-id=405 bgcolor=#fefefe
| 303405 ||  || — || December 14, 2004 || Kitt Peak || Spacewatch || — || align=right | 1.0 km || 
|-id=406 bgcolor=#fefefe
| 303406 ||  || — || December 14, 2004 || Kitt Peak || Spacewatch || — || align=right | 1.0 km || 
|-id=407 bgcolor=#fefefe
| 303407 ||  || — || December 14, 2004 || Catalina || CSS || — || align=right | 1.3 km || 
|-id=408 bgcolor=#fefefe
| 303408 ||  || — || December 10, 2004 || Kitt Peak || Spacewatch || V || align=right data-sort-value="0.95" | 950 m || 
|-id=409 bgcolor=#fefefe
| 303409 ||  || — || December 11, 2004 || Kitt Peak || Spacewatch || V || align=right data-sort-value="0.92" | 920 m || 
|-id=410 bgcolor=#d6d6d6
| 303410 ||  || — || December 14, 2004 || Campo Imperatore || CINEOS || 3:2 || align=right | 4.0 km || 
|-id=411 bgcolor=#fefefe
| 303411 ||  || — || December 15, 2004 || Socorro || LINEAR || — || align=right data-sort-value="0.91" | 910 m || 
|-id=412 bgcolor=#fefefe
| 303412 ||  || — || December 16, 2004 || Kitt Peak || Spacewatch || — || align=right data-sort-value="0.83" | 830 m || 
|-id=413 bgcolor=#fefefe
| 303413 ||  || — || December 18, 2004 || Mount Lemmon || Mount Lemmon Survey || — || align=right | 1.0 km || 
|-id=414 bgcolor=#fefefe
| 303414 ||  || — || December 18, 2004 || Mount Lemmon || Mount Lemmon Survey || MAS || align=right data-sort-value="0.88" | 880 m || 
|-id=415 bgcolor=#fefefe
| 303415 ||  || — || December 18, 2004 || Mount Lemmon || Mount Lemmon Survey || — || align=right | 1.2 km || 
|-id=416 bgcolor=#fefefe
| 303416 ||  || — || December 18, 2004 || Mount Lemmon || Mount Lemmon Survey || MAS || align=right data-sort-value="0.75" | 750 m || 
|-id=417 bgcolor=#fefefe
| 303417 ||  || — || December 18, 2004 || Mount Lemmon || Mount Lemmon Survey || — || align=right | 1.0 km || 
|-id=418 bgcolor=#fefefe
| 303418 || 2005 AO || — || January 5, 2005 || Pla D'Arguines || Pla D'Arguines Obs. || NYS || align=right data-sort-value="0.59" | 590 m || 
|-id=419 bgcolor=#fefefe
| 303419 ||  || — || January 1, 2005 || Catalina || CSS || — || align=right | 1.1 km || 
|-id=420 bgcolor=#fefefe
| 303420 ||  || — || January 6, 2005 || Catalina || CSS || — || align=right data-sort-value="0.83" | 830 m || 
|-id=421 bgcolor=#fefefe
| 303421 ||  || — || January 6, 2005 || Catalina || CSS || V || align=right data-sort-value="0.92" | 920 m || 
|-id=422 bgcolor=#fefefe
| 303422 ||  || — || January 6, 2005 || Catalina || CSS || — || align=right | 1.4 km || 
|-id=423 bgcolor=#fefefe
| 303423 ||  || — || January 6, 2005 || Catalina || CSS || — || align=right | 1.2 km || 
|-id=424 bgcolor=#fefefe
| 303424 ||  || — || January 6, 2005 || Catalina || CSS || NYS || align=right | 1.0 km || 
|-id=425 bgcolor=#fefefe
| 303425 ||  || — || January 6, 2005 || Catalina || CSS || ERI || align=right | 1.7 km || 
|-id=426 bgcolor=#fefefe
| 303426 ||  || — || January 6, 2005 || Socorro || LINEAR || NYS || align=right data-sort-value="0.77" | 770 m || 
|-id=427 bgcolor=#fefefe
| 303427 ||  || — || January 6, 2005 || Catalina || CSS || — || align=right | 1.2 km || 
|-id=428 bgcolor=#fefefe
| 303428 ||  || — || January 6, 2005 || Catalina || CSS || — || align=right | 1.1 km || 
|-id=429 bgcolor=#fefefe
| 303429 ||  || — || January 6, 2005 || Catalina || CSS || — || align=right data-sort-value="0.98" | 980 m || 
|-id=430 bgcolor=#fefefe
| 303430 ||  || — || January 7, 2005 || Socorro || LINEAR || NYS || align=right data-sort-value="0.79" | 790 m || 
|-id=431 bgcolor=#fefefe
| 303431 ||  || — || January 11, 2005 || Socorro || LINEAR || MAS || align=right data-sort-value="0.97" | 970 m || 
|-id=432 bgcolor=#fefefe
| 303432 ||  || — || January 13, 2005 || Kitt Peak || Spacewatch || V || align=right data-sort-value="0.87" | 870 m || 
|-id=433 bgcolor=#fefefe
| 303433 ||  || — || January 13, 2005 || Socorro || LINEAR || LCI || align=right | 1.4 km || 
|-id=434 bgcolor=#fefefe
| 303434 ||  || — || January 13, 2005 || Socorro || LINEAR || — || align=right | 1.1 km || 
|-id=435 bgcolor=#fefefe
| 303435 ||  || — || January 15, 2005 || Kitt Peak || Spacewatch || NYS || align=right data-sort-value="0.84" | 840 m || 
|-id=436 bgcolor=#fefefe
| 303436 ||  || — || January 13, 2005 || Catalina || CSS || — || align=right data-sort-value="0.96" | 960 m || 
|-id=437 bgcolor=#E9E9E9
| 303437 ||  || — || January 13, 2005 || Catalina || CSS || — || align=right | 1.4 km || 
|-id=438 bgcolor=#fefefe
| 303438 ||  || — || January 13, 2005 || Kitt Peak || Spacewatch || — || align=right data-sort-value="0.91" | 910 m || 
|-id=439 bgcolor=#fefefe
| 303439 ||  || — || January 15, 2005 || Socorro || LINEAR || NYS || align=right data-sort-value="0.68" | 680 m || 
|-id=440 bgcolor=#fefefe
| 303440 ||  || — || January 15, 2005 || Kitt Peak || Spacewatch || — || align=right | 1.1 km || 
|-id=441 bgcolor=#fefefe
| 303441 ||  || — || January 15, 2005 || Kitt Peak || Spacewatch || EUT || align=right data-sort-value="0.85" | 850 m || 
|-id=442 bgcolor=#fefefe
| 303442 ||  || — || January 13, 2005 || Kitt Peak || Spacewatch || — || align=right data-sort-value="0.81" | 810 m || 
|-id=443 bgcolor=#fefefe
| 303443 ||  || — || January 13, 2005 || Kitt Peak || Spacewatch || — || align=right data-sort-value="0.76" | 760 m || 
|-id=444 bgcolor=#E9E9E9
| 303444 ||  || — || January 15, 2005 || Kitt Peak || Spacewatch || — || align=right | 1.2 km || 
|-id=445 bgcolor=#fefefe
| 303445 ||  || — || January 15, 2005 || Kitt Peak || Spacewatch || NYS || align=right data-sort-value="0.81" | 810 m || 
|-id=446 bgcolor=#fefefe
| 303446 ||  || — || January 15, 2005 || Kitt Peak || Spacewatch || NYS || align=right data-sort-value="0.66" | 660 m || 
|-id=447 bgcolor=#fefefe
| 303447 ||  || — || January 15, 2005 || Kitt Peak || Spacewatch || — || align=right data-sort-value="0.88" | 880 m || 
|-id=448 bgcolor=#fefefe
| 303448 ||  || — || January 15, 2005 || Kitt Peak || Spacewatch || NYS || align=right data-sort-value="0.83" | 830 m || 
|-id=449 bgcolor=#FFC2E0
| 303449 ||  || — || January 18, 2005 || Kitt Peak || Spacewatch || APO +1km || align=right data-sort-value="0.80" | 800 m || 
|-id=450 bgcolor=#FFC2E0
| 303450 ||  || — || January 19, 2005 || Socorro || LINEAR || APOPHA || align=right data-sort-value="0.19" | 190 m || 
|-id=451 bgcolor=#fefefe
| 303451 ||  || — || January 16, 2005 || Socorro || LINEAR || MAS || align=right data-sort-value="0.88" | 880 m || 
|-id=452 bgcolor=#fefefe
| 303452 ||  || — || January 20, 2005 || Wrightwood || J. W. Young || — || align=right data-sort-value="0.91" | 910 m || 
|-id=453 bgcolor=#fefefe
| 303453 ||  || — || January 16, 2005 || Socorro || LINEAR || — || align=right | 1.3 km || 
|-id=454 bgcolor=#fefefe
| 303454 ||  || — || January 16, 2005 || Kitt Peak || Spacewatch || — || align=right data-sort-value="0.75" | 750 m || 
|-id=455 bgcolor=#d6d6d6
| 303455 ||  || — || January 16, 2005 || Kitt Peak || Spacewatch || SHU3:2 || align=right | 5.2 km || 
|-id=456 bgcolor=#E9E9E9
| 303456 ||  || — || February 1, 2005 || Catalina || CSS || — || align=right | 2.4 km || 
|-id=457 bgcolor=#fefefe
| 303457 ||  || — || February 1, 2005 || Catalina || CSS || — || align=right data-sort-value="0.94" | 940 m || 
|-id=458 bgcolor=#fefefe
| 303458 ||  || — || February 1, 2005 || Catalina || CSS || — || align=right data-sort-value="0.96" | 960 m || 
|-id=459 bgcolor=#fefefe
| 303459 ||  || — || February 1, 2005 || Kitt Peak || Spacewatch || — || align=right | 1.0 km || 
|-id=460 bgcolor=#fefefe
| 303460 ||  || — || February 2, 2005 || Kitt Peak || Spacewatch || NYS || align=right data-sort-value="0.61" | 610 m || 
|-id=461 bgcolor=#fefefe
| 303461 ||  || — || February 2, 2005 || Kitt Peak || Spacewatch || V || align=right data-sort-value="0.69" | 690 m || 
|-id=462 bgcolor=#fefefe
| 303462 ||  || — || February 2, 2005 || Socorro || LINEAR || NYS || align=right data-sort-value="0.65" | 650 m || 
|-id=463 bgcolor=#fefefe
| 303463 ||  || — || February 2, 2005 || Catalina || CSS || — || align=right | 1.4 km || 
|-id=464 bgcolor=#fefefe
| 303464 ||  || — || February 5, 2005 || Uccle || T. Pauwels || — || align=right data-sort-value="0.95" | 950 m || 
|-id=465 bgcolor=#fefefe
| 303465 ||  || — || February 1, 2005 || Catalina || CSS || SUL || align=right | 2.9 km || 
|-id=466 bgcolor=#fefefe
| 303466 ||  || — || February 1, 2005 || Kitt Peak || Spacewatch || — || align=right data-sort-value="0.98" | 980 m || 
|-id=467 bgcolor=#fefefe
| 303467 ||  || — || February 2, 2005 || Socorro || LINEAR || — || align=right data-sort-value="0.87" | 870 m || 
|-id=468 bgcolor=#fefefe
| 303468 ||  || — || February 2, 2005 || Catalina || CSS || NYS || align=right data-sort-value="0.69" | 690 m || 
|-id=469 bgcolor=#fefefe
| 303469 ||  || — || February 3, 2005 || Socorro || LINEAR || — || align=right | 1.4 km || 
|-id=470 bgcolor=#E9E9E9
| 303470 ||  || — || February 13, 2005 || La Silla || A. Boattini, H. Scholl || GAL || align=right | 2.0 km || 
|-id=471 bgcolor=#fefefe
| 303471 ||  || — || February 9, 2005 || Kitt Peak || Spacewatch || NYS || align=right data-sort-value="0.85" | 850 m || 
|-id=472 bgcolor=#E9E9E9
| 303472 ||  || — || February 15, 2005 || Gnosca || S. Sposetti || — || align=right | 1.6 km || 
|-id=473 bgcolor=#fefefe
| 303473 ||  || — || February 1, 2005 || Catalina || CSS || — || align=right | 1.6 km || 
|-id=474 bgcolor=#E9E9E9
| 303474 ||  || — || February 2, 2005 || Catalina || CSS || — || align=right | 1.6 km || 
|-id=475 bgcolor=#E9E9E9
| 303475 ||  || — || February 1, 2005 || Kitt Peak || Spacewatch || — || align=right | 1.8 km || 
|-id=476 bgcolor=#E9E9E9
| 303476 ||  || — || March 2, 2005 || Kitt Peak || Spacewatch || RAF || align=right data-sort-value="0.89" | 890 m || 
|-id=477 bgcolor=#fefefe
| 303477 ||  || — || March 3, 2005 || Catalina || CSS || MAS || align=right data-sort-value="0.98" | 980 m || 
|-id=478 bgcolor=#E9E9E9
| 303478 ||  || — || March 3, 2005 || Catalina || CSS || — || align=right | 1.3 km || 
|-id=479 bgcolor=#E9E9E9
| 303479 ||  || — || March 3, 2005 || Catalina || CSS || — || align=right | 2.4 km || 
|-id=480 bgcolor=#fefefe
| 303480 ||  || — || March 3, 2005 || Catalina || CSS || NYS || align=right data-sort-value="0.78" | 780 m || 
|-id=481 bgcolor=#E9E9E9
| 303481 ||  || — || March 1, 2005 || Catalina || CSS || MAR || align=right | 1.3 km || 
|-id=482 bgcolor=#E9E9E9
| 303482 ||  || — || March 3, 2005 || Catalina || CSS || — || align=right | 2.1 km || 
|-id=483 bgcolor=#E9E9E9
| 303483 ||  || — || March 3, 2005 || Catalina || CSS || — || align=right | 1.5 km || 
|-id=484 bgcolor=#E9E9E9
| 303484 ||  || — || March 3, 2005 || Kitt Peak || Spacewatch || — || align=right | 2.0 km || 
|-id=485 bgcolor=#E9E9E9
| 303485 ||  || — || March 8, 2005 || Anderson Mesa || LONEOS || — || align=right | 1.4 km || 
|-id=486 bgcolor=#E9E9E9
| 303486 ||  || — || March 2, 2005 || Catalina || CSS || — || align=right | 1.6 km || 
|-id=487 bgcolor=#E9E9E9
| 303487 ||  || — || March 3, 2005 || Kitt Peak || Spacewatch || — || align=right | 2.5 km || 
|-id=488 bgcolor=#E9E9E9
| 303488 ||  || — || March 8, 2005 || Mount Lemmon || Mount Lemmon Survey || — || align=right | 1.8 km || 
|-id=489 bgcolor=#E9E9E9
| 303489 ||  || — || March 3, 2005 || Catalina || CSS || — || align=right | 2.1 km || 
|-id=490 bgcolor=#E9E9E9
| 303490 ||  || — || March 3, 2005 || Catalina || CSS || RAF || align=right | 1.1 km || 
|-id=491 bgcolor=#E9E9E9
| 303491 ||  || — || March 3, 2005 || Kitt Peak || Spacewatch || MAR || align=right | 1.3 km || 
|-id=492 bgcolor=#E9E9E9
| 303492 ||  || — || March 4, 2005 || Mount Lemmon || Mount Lemmon Survey || EUN || align=right | 1.7 km || 
|-id=493 bgcolor=#E9E9E9
| 303493 ||  || — || March 7, 2005 || Socorro || LINEAR || — || align=right | 1.3 km || 
|-id=494 bgcolor=#E9E9E9
| 303494 ||  || — || March 8, 2005 || Socorro || LINEAR || — || align=right | 1.2 km || 
|-id=495 bgcolor=#E9E9E9
| 303495 ||  || — || March 8, 2005 || Mount Lemmon || Mount Lemmon Survey || — || align=right | 1.5 km || 
|-id=496 bgcolor=#E9E9E9
| 303496 ||  || — || March 9, 2005 || Kitt Peak || Spacewatch || — || align=right | 1.3 km || 
|-id=497 bgcolor=#fefefe
| 303497 ||  || — || March 9, 2005 || Mount Lemmon || Mount Lemmon Survey || — || align=right | 1.0 km || 
|-id=498 bgcolor=#E9E9E9
| 303498 ||  || — || March 9, 2005 || Goodricke-Pigott || R. A. Tucker || — || align=right | 1.9 km || 
|-id=499 bgcolor=#E9E9E9
| 303499 ||  || — || March 9, 2005 || Anderson Mesa || LONEOS || — || align=right | 2.6 km || 
|-id=500 bgcolor=#E9E9E9
| 303500 ||  || — || March 10, 2005 || Catalina || CSS || — || align=right | 1.5 km || 
|}

303501–303600 

|-bgcolor=#E9E9E9
| 303501 ||  || — || March 10, 2005 || Catalina || CSS || INO || align=right | 1.7 km || 
|-id=502 bgcolor=#E9E9E9
| 303502 ||  || — || March 10, 2005 || Kitt Peak || Spacewatch || — || align=right | 1.6 km || 
|-id=503 bgcolor=#E9E9E9
| 303503 ||  || — || March 10, 2005 || Kitt Peak || Spacewatch || — || align=right | 1.7 km || 
|-id=504 bgcolor=#E9E9E9
| 303504 ||  || — || March 10, 2005 || Kitt Peak || Spacewatch || — || align=right | 2.3 km || 
|-id=505 bgcolor=#E9E9E9
| 303505 ||  || — || March 9, 2005 || Mount Lemmon || Mount Lemmon Survey || — || align=right | 1.9 km || 
|-id=506 bgcolor=#E9E9E9
| 303506 ||  || — || March 10, 2005 || Mount Lemmon || Mount Lemmon Survey || — || align=right | 1.1 km || 
|-id=507 bgcolor=#E9E9E9
| 303507 ||  || — || March 11, 2005 || Mount Lemmon || Mount Lemmon Survey || — || align=right | 1.3 km || 
|-id=508 bgcolor=#E9E9E9
| 303508 ||  || — || March 11, 2005 || Mount Lemmon || Mount Lemmon Survey || — || align=right | 1.4 km || 
|-id=509 bgcolor=#E9E9E9
| 303509 ||  || — || March 7, 2005 || Socorro || LINEAR || EUN || align=right | 1.7 km || 
|-id=510 bgcolor=#E9E9E9
| 303510 ||  || — || March 8, 2005 || Mount Lemmon || Mount Lemmon Survey || — || align=right | 1.1 km || 
|-id=511 bgcolor=#fefefe
| 303511 ||  || — || March 9, 2005 || Mount Lemmon || Mount Lemmon Survey || NYS || align=right data-sort-value="0.69" | 690 m || 
|-id=512 bgcolor=#E9E9E9
| 303512 ||  || — || March 9, 2005 || Mount Lemmon || Mount Lemmon Survey || — || align=right | 2.0 km || 
|-id=513 bgcolor=#E9E9E9
| 303513 ||  || — || March 10, 2005 || Mount Lemmon || Mount Lemmon Survey || — || align=right | 1.3 km || 
|-id=514 bgcolor=#fefefe
| 303514 ||  || — || March 11, 2005 || Kitt Peak || Spacewatch || — || align=right | 1.3 km || 
|-id=515 bgcolor=#E9E9E9
| 303515 ||  || — || March 11, 2005 || Mount Lemmon || Mount Lemmon Survey || — || align=right | 1.0 km || 
|-id=516 bgcolor=#fefefe
| 303516 ||  || — || March 11, 2005 || Anderson Mesa || LONEOS || — || align=right | 1.5 km || 
|-id=517 bgcolor=#E9E9E9
| 303517 ||  || — || March 10, 2005 || Mount Lemmon || Mount Lemmon Survey || — || align=right | 1.6 km || 
|-id=518 bgcolor=#E9E9E9
| 303518 ||  || — || March 11, 2005 || Kitt Peak || Spacewatch || — || align=right | 1.8 km || 
|-id=519 bgcolor=#E9E9E9
| 303519 ||  || — || March 13, 2005 || Catalina || CSS || — || align=right | 1.9 km || 
|-id=520 bgcolor=#fefefe
| 303520 ||  || — || March 4, 2005 || Socorro || LINEAR || NYS || align=right data-sort-value="0.96" | 960 m || 
|-id=521 bgcolor=#E9E9E9
| 303521 ||  || — || March 4, 2005 || Catalina || CSS || — || align=right | 2.0 km || 
|-id=522 bgcolor=#E9E9E9
| 303522 ||  || — || March 10, 2005 || Siding Spring || SSS || ADE || align=right | 2.8 km || 
|-id=523 bgcolor=#E9E9E9
| 303523 ||  || — || March 9, 2005 || Socorro || LINEAR || — || align=right | 1.1 km || 
|-id=524 bgcolor=#E9E9E9
| 303524 ||  || — || March 9, 2005 || Mount Lemmon || Mount Lemmon Survey || — || align=right | 1.0 km || 
|-id=525 bgcolor=#E9E9E9
| 303525 ||  || — || April 14, 2001 || Kitt Peak || Spacewatch || — || align=right | 2.0 km || 
|-id=526 bgcolor=#fefefe
| 303526 ||  || — || March 10, 2005 || Anderson Mesa || LONEOS || V || align=right data-sort-value="0.98" | 980 m || 
|-id=527 bgcolor=#E9E9E9
| 303527 ||  || — || March 10, 2005 || Anderson Mesa || LONEOS || — || align=right | 2.0 km || 
|-id=528 bgcolor=#E9E9E9
| 303528 ||  || — || March 12, 2005 || Kitt Peak || Spacewatch || — || align=right | 1.3 km || 
|-id=529 bgcolor=#fefefe
| 303529 ||  || — || March 13, 2005 || Kitt Peak || Spacewatch || MAS || align=right data-sort-value="0.74" | 740 m || 
|-id=530 bgcolor=#E9E9E9
| 303530 ||  || — || March 3, 2005 || Kitt Peak || Spacewatch || — || align=right | 1.7 km || 
|-id=531 bgcolor=#E9E9E9
| 303531 ||  || — || March 12, 2005 || Socorro || LINEAR || — || align=right | 1.8 km || 
|-id=532 bgcolor=#E9E9E9
| 303532 ||  || — || March 13, 2005 || Kitt Peak || Spacewatch || — || align=right data-sort-value="0.98" | 980 m || 
|-id=533 bgcolor=#E9E9E9
| 303533 ||  || — || March 13, 2005 || Catalina || CSS || HNS || align=right | 2.0 km || 
|-id=534 bgcolor=#E9E9E9
| 303534 ||  || — || March 13, 2005 || Kitt Peak || Spacewatch || MAR || align=right | 1.3 km || 
|-id=535 bgcolor=#E9E9E9
| 303535 ||  || — || March 15, 2005 || Mount Lemmon || Mount Lemmon Survey || JUN || align=right | 2.7 km || 
|-id=536 bgcolor=#E9E9E9
| 303536 ||  || — || March 13, 2005 || Anderson Mesa || LONEOS || — || align=right | 2.8 km || 
|-id=537 bgcolor=#E9E9E9
| 303537 ||  || — || March 10, 2005 || Mount Lemmon || Mount Lemmon Survey || — || align=right | 1.1 km || 
|-id=538 bgcolor=#fefefe
| 303538 ||  || — || March 3, 2005 || Kitt Peak || Spacewatch || 417 || align=right | 1.3 km || 
|-id=539 bgcolor=#E9E9E9
| 303539 ||  || — || March 10, 2005 || Catalina || CSS || — || align=right | 1.2 km || 
|-id=540 bgcolor=#E9E9E9
| 303540 ||  || — || March 9, 2005 || Mount Lemmon || Mount Lemmon Survey || — || align=right | 1.6 km || 
|-id=541 bgcolor=#E9E9E9
| 303541 ||  || — || March 10, 2005 || Kitt Peak || M. W. Buie || — || align=right data-sort-value="0.98" | 980 m || 
|-id=542 bgcolor=#E9E9E9
| 303542 ||  || — || March 11, 2005 || Mount Lemmon || Mount Lemmon Survey || — || align=right | 1.0 km || 
|-id=543 bgcolor=#E9E9E9
| 303543 ||  || — || March 12, 2005 || Kitt Peak || M. W. Buie || — || align=right | 1.4 km || 
|-id=544 bgcolor=#fefefe
| 303544 ||  || — || March 8, 2005 || Catalina || CSS || H || align=right | 1.3 km || 
|-id=545 bgcolor=#E9E9E9
| 303545 ||  || — || March 12, 2005 || Mount Lemmon || Mount Lemmon Survey || EUN || align=right | 2.1 km || 
|-id=546 bgcolor=#E9E9E9
| 303546 Bourbaki || 2005 FR ||  || March 16, 2005 || Saint-Sulpice || Saint-Sulpice Obs. || — || align=right | 3.1 km || 
|-id=547 bgcolor=#E9E9E9
| 303547 ||  || — || March 16, 2005 || Mount Lemmon || Mount Lemmon Survey || — || align=right | 1.4 km || 
|-id=548 bgcolor=#E9E9E9
| 303548 ||  || — || April 1, 2005 || Anderson Mesa || LONEOS || TIN || align=right | 2.4 km || 
|-id=549 bgcolor=#E9E9E9
| 303549 ||  || — || April 1, 2005 || Kitt Peak || Spacewatch || — || align=right | 1.2 km || 
|-id=550 bgcolor=#E9E9E9
| 303550 ||  || — || April 1, 2005 || Kitt Peak || Spacewatch || — || align=right | 2.0 km || 
|-id=551 bgcolor=#fefefe
| 303551 ||  || — || April 2, 2005 || Mount Lemmon || Mount Lemmon Survey || H || align=right data-sort-value="0.83" | 830 m || 
|-id=552 bgcolor=#E9E9E9
| 303552 ||  || — || April 1, 2005 || Anderson Mesa || LONEOS || — || align=right | 2.2 km || 
|-id=553 bgcolor=#E9E9E9
| 303553 ||  || — || April 3, 2005 || Palomar || NEAT || EUN || align=right | 1.5 km || 
|-id=554 bgcolor=#fefefe
| 303554 ||  || — || April 6, 2005 || Siding Spring || SSS || H || align=right | 1.3 km || 
|-id=555 bgcolor=#fefefe
| 303555 ||  || — || April 2, 2005 || Mount Lemmon || Mount Lemmon Survey || MAS || align=right data-sort-value="0.66" | 660 m || 
|-id=556 bgcolor=#E9E9E9
| 303556 ||  || — || April 5, 2005 || Anderson Mesa || LONEOS || — || align=right | 2.7 km || 
|-id=557 bgcolor=#E9E9E9
| 303557 ||  || — || April 5, 2005 || Mount Lemmon || Mount Lemmon Survey || MIS || align=right | 2.7 km || 
|-id=558 bgcolor=#E9E9E9
| 303558 ||  || — || April 5, 2005 || Mount Lemmon || Mount Lemmon Survey || — || align=right data-sort-value="0.98" | 980 m || 
|-id=559 bgcolor=#E9E9E9
| 303559 ||  || — || April 2, 2005 || Mount Lemmon || Mount Lemmon Survey || WIT || align=right | 1.2 km || 
|-id=560 bgcolor=#E9E9E9
| 303560 ||  || — || April 2, 2005 || Mount Lemmon || Mount Lemmon Survey || — || align=right | 1.9 km || 
|-id=561 bgcolor=#E9E9E9
| 303561 ||  || — || April 6, 2005 || Mount Lemmon || Mount Lemmon Survey || — || align=right | 1.7 km || 
|-id=562 bgcolor=#E9E9E9
| 303562 ||  || — || April 6, 2005 || Kitt Peak || Spacewatch || RAF || align=right data-sort-value="0.99" | 990 m || 
|-id=563 bgcolor=#fefefe
| 303563 ||  || — || April 1, 2005 || Anderson Mesa || LONEOS || H || align=right data-sort-value="0.62" | 620 m || 
|-id=564 bgcolor=#E9E9E9
| 303564 ||  || — || April 2, 2005 || Catalina || CSS || EUN || align=right | 1.4 km || 
|-id=565 bgcolor=#E9E9E9
| 303565 ||  || — || April 2, 2005 || Mount Lemmon || Mount Lemmon Survey || — || align=right | 2.1 km || 
|-id=566 bgcolor=#E9E9E9
| 303566 ||  || — || April 6, 2005 || Catalina || CSS || — || align=right | 3.7 km || 
|-id=567 bgcolor=#E9E9E9
| 303567 ||  || — || April 6, 2005 || Kitt Peak || Spacewatch || — || align=right | 2.4 km || 
|-id=568 bgcolor=#E9E9E9
| 303568 ||  || — || April 6, 2005 || Kitt Peak || Spacewatch || — || align=right | 1.5 km || 
|-id=569 bgcolor=#E9E9E9
| 303569 ||  || — || April 7, 2005 || Kitt Peak || Spacewatch || — || align=right | 2.1 km || 
|-id=570 bgcolor=#E9E9E9
| 303570 ||  || — || April 10, 2005 || Kitt Peak || Spacewatch || — || align=right | 2.7 km || 
|-id=571 bgcolor=#E9E9E9
| 303571 ||  || — || April 10, 2005 || Mount Lemmon || Mount Lemmon Survey || — || align=right | 2.0 km || 
|-id=572 bgcolor=#E9E9E9
| 303572 ||  || — || April 10, 2005 || Mount Lemmon || Mount Lemmon Survey || BRG || align=right | 1.8 km || 
|-id=573 bgcolor=#E9E9E9
| 303573 ||  || — || April 4, 2005 || Catalina || CSS || — || align=right | 2.0 km || 
|-id=574 bgcolor=#E9E9E9
| 303574 ||  || — || April 11, 2005 || Kitt Peak || Spacewatch || — || align=right | 1.6 km || 
|-id=575 bgcolor=#E9E9E9
| 303575 ||  || — || April 11, 2005 || Kitt Peak || Spacewatch || HNA || align=right | 3.0 km || 
|-id=576 bgcolor=#E9E9E9
| 303576 ||  || — || April 8, 2005 || Socorro || LINEAR || — || align=right | 3.5 km || 
|-id=577 bgcolor=#E9E9E9
| 303577 ||  || — || April 8, 2005 || Socorro || LINEAR || ADE || align=right | 3.7 km || 
|-id=578 bgcolor=#E9E9E9
| 303578 ||  || — || April 9, 2005 || Catalina || CSS || — || align=right | 3.3 km || 
|-id=579 bgcolor=#E9E9E9
| 303579 ||  || — || April 12, 2005 || Mount Lemmon || Mount Lemmon Survey || — || align=right | 1.2 km || 
|-id=580 bgcolor=#E9E9E9
| 303580 ||  || — || April 10, 2005 || Kitt Peak || Spacewatch || MRX || align=right | 1.2 km || 
|-id=581 bgcolor=#E9E9E9
| 303581 ||  || — || April 10, 2005 || Kitt Peak || Spacewatch || — || align=right | 1.5 km || 
|-id=582 bgcolor=#E9E9E9
| 303582 ||  || — || April 10, 2005 || Mount Lemmon || Mount Lemmon Survey || NEM || align=right | 2.4 km || 
|-id=583 bgcolor=#E9E9E9
| 303583 ||  || — || April 4, 2005 || Catalina || CSS || — || align=right | 1.8 km || 
|-id=584 bgcolor=#fefefe
| 303584 ||  || — || April 2, 2005 || Catalina || CSS || H || align=right data-sort-value="0.97" | 970 m || 
|-id=585 bgcolor=#E9E9E9
| 303585 ||  || — || April 11, 2005 || Kitt Peak || Spacewatch || — || align=right | 2.1 km || 
|-id=586 bgcolor=#E9E9E9
| 303586 ||  || — || April 11, 2005 || Kitt Peak || Spacewatch || — || align=right | 3.2 km || 
|-id=587 bgcolor=#E9E9E9
| 303587 ||  || — || April 11, 2005 || Kitt Peak || Spacewatch || — || align=right | 2.4 km || 
|-id=588 bgcolor=#E9E9E9
| 303588 ||  || — || April 11, 2005 || Kitt Peak || Spacewatch || — || align=right | 2.8 km || 
|-id=589 bgcolor=#E9E9E9
| 303589 ||  || — || April 11, 2005 || Kitt Peak || Spacewatch || — || align=right data-sort-value="0.93" | 930 m || 
|-id=590 bgcolor=#E9E9E9
| 303590 ||  || — || April 14, 2005 || Kitt Peak || Spacewatch || NEM || align=right | 2.6 km || 
|-id=591 bgcolor=#E9E9E9
| 303591 ||  || — || April 14, 2005 || Kitt Peak || Spacewatch || NEM || align=right | 2.9 km || 
|-id=592 bgcolor=#E9E9E9
| 303592 ||  || — || April 14, 2005 || Kitt Peak || Spacewatch || — || align=right | 4.1 km || 
|-id=593 bgcolor=#E9E9E9
| 303593 ||  || — || April 10, 2005 || Kitt Peak || Spacewatch || — || align=right | 2.5 km || 
|-id=594 bgcolor=#E9E9E9
| 303594 ||  || — || April 12, 2005 || Kitt Peak || M. W. Buie || — || align=right | 1.3 km || 
|-id=595 bgcolor=#E9E9E9
| 303595 ||  || — || April 10, 2005 || Kitt Peak || M. W. Buie || HOF || align=right | 3.2 km || 
|-id=596 bgcolor=#E9E9E9
| 303596 ||  || — || April 5, 2005 || Mount Lemmon || Mount Lemmon Survey || — || align=right | 1.1 km || 
|-id=597 bgcolor=#E9E9E9
| 303597 ||  || — || April 14, 2005 || Catalina || CSS || — || align=right | 1.5 km || 
|-id=598 bgcolor=#E9E9E9
| 303598 ||  || — || April 30, 2005 || Goodricke-Pigott || R. A. Tucker || — || align=right | 2.9 km || 
|-id=599 bgcolor=#E9E9E9
| 303599 ||  || — || April 30, 2005 || Kitt Peak || Spacewatch || WIT || align=right | 1.5 km || 
|-id=600 bgcolor=#E9E9E9
| 303600 ||  || — || May 3, 2005 || Socorro || LINEAR || RAF || align=right | 1.4 km || 
|}

303601–303700 

|-bgcolor=#E9E9E9
| 303601 ||  || — || May 1, 2005 || Kitt Peak || Spacewatch || — || align=right | 4.2 km || 
|-id=602 bgcolor=#E9E9E9
| 303602 ||  || — || May 4, 2005 || Mauna Kea || C. Veillet || — || align=right | 1.4 km || 
|-id=603 bgcolor=#E9E9E9
| 303603 ||  || — || May 4, 2005 || Mauna Kea || C. Veillet || — || align=right | 1.2 km || 
|-id=604 bgcolor=#E9E9E9
| 303604 ||  || — || May 4, 2005 || Kitt Peak || Spacewatch || HNS || align=right | 1.6 km || 
|-id=605 bgcolor=#E9E9E9
| 303605 ||  || — || May 4, 2005 || Catalina || CSS || INO || align=right | 1.6 km || 
|-id=606 bgcolor=#fefefe
| 303606 ||  || — || May 4, 2005 || Catalina || CSS || H || align=right data-sort-value="0.67" | 670 m || 
|-id=607 bgcolor=#E9E9E9
| 303607 ||  || — || May 2, 2005 || Kitt Peak || Spacewatch || — || align=right | 1.5 km || 
|-id=608 bgcolor=#E9E9E9
| 303608 ||  || — || May 3, 2005 || Kitt Peak || Spacewatch || — || align=right | 2.3 km || 
|-id=609 bgcolor=#E9E9E9
| 303609 ||  || — || May 3, 2005 || Kitt Peak || Spacewatch || — || align=right | 1.6 km || 
|-id=610 bgcolor=#E9E9E9
| 303610 ||  || — || May 3, 2005 || Socorro || LINEAR || ADE || align=right | 3.9 km || 
|-id=611 bgcolor=#d6d6d6
| 303611 ||  || — || May 3, 2005 || Kitt Peak || Spacewatch || TRE || align=right | 2.9 km || 
|-id=612 bgcolor=#E9E9E9
| 303612 ||  || — || May 4, 2005 || Palomar || NEAT || — || align=right | 2.6 km || 
|-id=613 bgcolor=#E9E9E9
| 303613 ||  || — || May 4, 2005 || Mount Lemmon || Mount Lemmon Survey || — || align=right | 4.6 km || 
|-id=614 bgcolor=#fefefe
| 303614 ||  || — || May 4, 2005 || Kitt Peak || Spacewatch || H || align=right data-sort-value="0.64" | 640 m || 
|-id=615 bgcolor=#E9E9E9
| 303615 ||  || — || May 8, 2005 || Anderson Mesa || LONEOS || — || align=right | 1.3 km || 
|-id=616 bgcolor=#FA8072
| 303616 ||  || — || May 4, 2005 || Palomar || NEAT || H || align=right | 1.2 km || 
|-id=617 bgcolor=#E9E9E9
| 303617 ||  || — || May 3, 2005 || Kitt Peak || Spacewatch || — || align=right | 2.8 km || 
|-id=618 bgcolor=#E9E9E9
| 303618 ||  || — || May 4, 2005 || Kitt Peak || Spacewatch || GEF || align=right | 1.6 km || 
|-id=619 bgcolor=#E9E9E9
| 303619 ||  || — || May 4, 2005 || Kitt Peak || Spacewatch || — || align=right | 1.5 km || 
|-id=620 bgcolor=#E9E9E9
| 303620 ||  || — || May 4, 2005 || Kitt Peak || Spacewatch || — || align=right | 2.5 km || 
|-id=621 bgcolor=#E9E9E9
| 303621 ||  || — || May 4, 2005 || Mount Lemmon || Mount Lemmon Survey || — || align=right | 2.7 km || 
|-id=622 bgcolor=#E9E9E9
| 303622 ||  || — || May 4, 2005 || Kitt Peak || Spacewatch || — || align=right | 1.9 km || 
|-id=623 bgcolor=#E9E9E9
| 303623 ||  || — || May 4, 2005 || Palomar || NEAT || — || align=right | 3.0 km || 
|-id=624 bgcolor=#E9E9E9
| 303624 ||  || — || May 4, 2005 || Palomar || NEAT || — || align=right | 1.5 km || 
|-id=625 bgcolor=#E9E9E9
| 303625 ||  || — || May 4, 2005 || Palomar || NEAT || HNS || align=right | 1.6 km || 
|-id=626 bgcolor=#E9E9E9
| 303626 ||  || — || May 6, 2005 || Catalina || CSS || — || align=right | 3.5 km || 
|-id=627 bgcolor=#E9E9E9
| 303627 ||  || — || May 8, 2005 || Kitt Peak || Spacewatch || — || align=right | 1.1 km || 
|-id=628 bgcolor=#E9E9E9
| 303628 ||  || — || May 9, 2005 || Mount Lemmon || Mount Lemmon Survey || INO || align=right | 1.6 km || 
|-id=629 bgcolor=#fefefe
| 303629 ||  || — || May 10, 2005 || Catalina || CSS || H || align=right | 1.1 km || 
|-id=630 bgcolor=#E9E9E9
| 303630 ||  || — || May 11, 2005 || Kitt Peak || Spacewatch || EUN || align=right | 1.5 km || 
|-id=631 bgcolor=#E9E9E9
| 303631 ||  || — || May 8, 2005 || Mount Lemmon || Mount Lemmon Survey || — || align=right | 3.1 km || 
|-id=632 bgcolor=#E9E9E9
| 303632 ||  || — || May 11, 2005 || Mount Lemmon || Mount Lemmon Survey || — || align=right data-sort-value="0.90" | 900 m || 
|-id=633 bgcolor=#E9E9E9
| 303633 ||  || — || May 11, 2005 || Palomar || NEAT || AER || align=right | 2.2 km || 
|-id=634 bgcolor=#fefefe
| 303634 ||  || — || May 8, 2005 || Mount Lemmon || Mount Lemmon Survey || — || align=right data-sort-value="0.93" | 930 m || 
|-id=635 bgcolor=#E9E9E9
| 303635 ||  || — || May 9, 2005 || Kitt Peak || Spacewatch || WIT || align=right | 1.3 km || 
|-id=636 bgcolor=#E9E9E9
| 303636 ||  || — || May 11, 2005 || Mount Lemmon || Mount Lemmon Survey || AGN || align=right | 1.8 km || 
|-id=637 bgcolor=#E9E9E9
| 303637 ||  || — || May 14, 2005 || Kitt Peak || Spacewatch || HOF || align=right | 3.4 km || 
|-id=638 bgcolor=#E9E9E9
| 303638 ||  || — || May 14, 2005 || Kitt Peak || Spacewatch || MAR || align=right | 1.5 km || 
|-id=639 bgcolor=#E9E9E9
| 303639 ||  || — || May 15, 2005 || Palomar || NEAT || — || align=right | 2.0 km || 
|-id=640 bgcolor=#E9E9E9
| 303640 ||  || — || May 15, 2005 || Mount Lemmon || Mount Lemmon Survey || — || align=right | 3.9 km || 
|-id=641 bgcolor=#d6d6d6
| 303641 ||  || — || May 15, 2005 || Palomar || NEAT || — || align=right | 6.2 km || 
|-id=642 bgcolor=#E9E9E9
| 303642 ||  || — || May 7, 2005 || Mount Lemmon || Mount Lemmon Survey || AGN || align=right | 1.4 km || 
|-id=643 bgcolor=#E9E9E9
| 303643 ||  || — || May 8, 2005 || Kitt Peak || Spacewatch || HOF || align=right | 3.4 km || 
|-id=644 bgcolor=#E9E9E9
| 303644 ||  || — || May 12, 2005 || Palomar || NEAT || — || align=right | 1.2 km || 
|-id=645 bgcolor=#E9E9E9
| 303645 ||  || — || May 8, 2005 || Kitt Peak || Spacewatch || — || align=right | 2.4 km || 
|-id=646 bgcolor=#E9E9E9
| 303646 ||  || — || May 16, 2005 || Mount Lemmon || Mount Lemmon Survey || — || align=right | 3.4 km || 
|-id=647 bgcolor=#E9E9E9
| 303647 ||  || — || May 16, 2005 || Mount Lemmon || Mount Lemmon Survey || — || align=right | 1.3 km || 
|-id=648 bgcolor=#fefefe
| 303648 Mikszáth ||  ||  || May 27, 2005 || Piszkéstető || K. Sárneczky || H || align=right data-sort-value="0.65" | 650 m || 
|-id=649 bgcolor=#fefefe
| 303649 ||  || — || May 29, 2005 || Siding Spring || SSS || H || align=right data-sort-value="0.74" | 740 m || 
|-id=650 bgcolor=#E9E9E9
| 303650 ||  || — || June 2, 2005 || Catalina || CSS || — || align=right | 3.6 km || 
|-id=651 bgcolor=#E9E9E9
| 303651 ||  || — || June 4, 2005 || Kitt Peak || Spacewatch || — || align=right | 1.4 km || 
|-id=652 bgcolor=#E9E9E9
| 303652 ||  || — || June 6, 2005 || Kitt Peak || Spacewatch || — || align=right | 1.4 km || 
|-id=653 bgcolor=#E9E9E9
| 303653 ||  || — || June 5, 2005 || Kitt Peak || Spacewatch || — || align=right | 2.3 km || 
|-id=654 bgcolor=#d6d6d6
| 303654 ||  || — || June 11, 2005 || Kitt Peak || Spacewatch || EOS || align=right | 2.4 km || 
|-id=655 bgcolor=#E9E9E9
| 303655 ||  || — || June 12, 2005 || Mount Lemmon || Mount Lemmon Survey || — || align=right | 2.6 km || 
|-id=656 bgcolor=#d6d6d6
| 303656 ||  || — || June 10, 2005 || Kitt Peak || Spacewatch || — || align=right | 4.6 km || 
|-id=657 bgcolor=#d6d6d6
| 303657 ||  || — || June 13, 2005 || Kitt Peak || Spacewatch || — || align=right | 3.2 km || 
|-id=658 bgcolor=#E9E9E9
| 303658 ||  || — || June 11, 2005 || Kitt Peak || Spacewatch || — || align=right | 1.3 km || 
|-id=659 bgcolor=#E9E9E9
| 303659 ||  || — || June 11, 2005 || Kitt Peak || Spacewatch || — || align=right | 1.4 km || 
|-id=660 bgcolor=#E9E9E9
| 303660 ||  || — || June 13, 2005 || Kitt Peak || Spacewatch || — || align=right | 3.7 km || 
|-id=661 bgcolor=#d6d6d6
| 303661 ||  || — || June 10, 2005 || Kitt Peak || Spacewatch || — || align=right | 2.7 km || 
|-id=662 bgcolor=#d6d6d6
| 303662 ||  || — || June 5, 2005 || Kitt Peak || Spacewatch || — || align=right | 3.5 km || 
|-id=663 bgcolor=#E9E9E9
| 303663 ||  || — || June 17, 2005 || Mount Lemmon || Mount Lemmon Survey || — || align=right | 2.6 km || 
|-id=664 bgcolor=#E9E9E9
| 303664 ||  || — || June 28, 2005 || Kitt Peak || Spacewatch || — || align=right | 3.4 km || 
|-id=665 bgcolor=#d6d6d6
| 303665 ||  || — || June 28, 2005 || Palomar || NEAT || — || align=right | 4.2 km || 
|-id=666 bgcolor=#d6d6d6
| 303666 ||  || — || June 29, 2005 || Palomar || NEAT || — || align=right | 4.1 km || 
|-id=667 bgcolor=#d6d6d6
| 303667 ||  || — || June 27, 2005 || Kitt Peak || Spacewatch || EOS || align=right | 2.4 km || 
|-id=668 bgcolor=#d6d6d6
| 303668 ||  || — || June 29, 2005 || Palomar || NEAT || TEL || align=right | 1.7 km || 
|-id=669 bgcolor=#d6d6d6
| 303669 ||  || — || June 30, 2005 || Kitt Peak || Spacewatch || — || align=right | 3.0 km || 
|-id=670 bgcolor=#d6d6d6
| 303670 ||  || — || June 30, 2005 || Kitt Peak || Spacewatch || — || align=right | 2.6 km || 
|-id=671 bgcolor=#d6d6d6
| 303671 ||  || — || June 30, 2005 || Kitt Peak || Spacewatch || — || align=right | 2.5 km || 
|-id=672 bgcolor=#d6d6d6
| 303672 ||  || — || June 30, 2005 || Kitt Peak || Spacewatch || — || align=right | 3.4 km || 
|-id=673 bgcolor=#d6d6d6
| 303673 ||  || — || June 30, 2005 || Kitt Peak || Spacewatch || — || align=right | 3.1 km || 
|-id=674 bgcolor=#d6d6d6
| 303674 ||  || — || June 30, 2005 || Kitt Peak || Spacewatch || — || align=right | 3.1 km || 
|-id=675 bgcolor=#d6d6d6
| 303675 ||  || — || June 28, 2005 || Palomar || NEAT || — || align=right | 4.0 km || 
|-id=676 bgcolor=#d6d6d6
| 303676 ||  || — || June 30, 2005 || Kitt Peak || Spacewatch || — || align=right | 3.4 km || 
|-id=677 bgcolor=#d6d6d6
| 303677 ||  || — || June 17, 2005 || Mount Lemmon || Mount Lemmon Survey || — || align=right | 2.8 km || 
|-id=678 bgcolor=#d6d6d6
| 303678 ||  || — || June 30, 2005 || Kitt Peak || Spacewatch || — || align=right | 4.3 km || 
|-id=679 bgcolor=#d6d6d6
| 303679 ||  || — || July 3, 2005 || Mount Lemmon || Mount Lemmon Survey || — || align=right | 2.4 km || 
|-id=680 bgcolor=#E9E9E9
| 303680 ||  || — || July 4, 2005 || Mount Lemmon || Mount Lemmon Survey || — || align=right | 2.4 km || 
|-id=681 bgcolor=#d6d6d6
| 303681 ||  || — || July 4, 2005 || Mount Lemmon || Mount Lemmon Survey || — || align=right | 2.7 km || 
|-id=682 bgcolor=#d6d6d6
| 303682 ||  || — || July 5, 2005 || Palomar || NEAT || EOS || align=right | 2.6 km || 
|-id=683 bgcolor=#d6d6d6
| 303683 ||  || — || July 4, 2005 || Kitt Peak || Spacewatch || THM || align=right | 3.0 km || 
|-id=684 bgcolor=#d6d6d6
| 303684 ||  || — || July 6, 2005 || Kitt Peak || Spacewatch || — || align=right | 3.2 km || 
|-id=685 bgcolor=#d6d6d6
| 303685 ||  || — || July 9, 2005 || Kitt Peak || Spacewatch || EOS || align=right | 2.5 km || 
|-id=686 bgcolor=#d6d6d6
| 303686 ||  || — || July 9, 2005 || Catalina || CSS || — || align=right | 4.7 km || 
|-id=687 bgcolor=#d6d6d6
| 303687 ||  || — || July 1, 2005 || Kitt Peak || Spacewatch || HYG || align=right | 3.0 km || 
|-id=688 bgcolor=#d6d6d6
| 303688 ||  || — || July 1, 2005 || Kitt Peak || Spacewatch || EOS || align=right | 2.5 km || 
|-id=689 bgcolor=#d6d6d6
| 303689 ||  || — || July 2, 2005 || Catalina || CSS || — || align=right | 4.6 km || 
|-id=690 bgcolor=#d6d6d6
| 303690 ||  || — || July 9, 2005 || Kitt Peak || Spacewatch || CHA || align=right | 2.5 km || 
|-id=691 bgcolor=#d6d6d6
| 303691 ||  || — || July 10, 2005 || Kitt Peak || Spacewatch || — || align=right | 3.8 km || 
|-id=692 bgcolor=#d6d6d6
| 303692 ||  || — || July 10, 2005 || Kitt Peak || Spacewatch || — || align=right | 3.1 km || 
|-id=693 bgcolor=#d6d6d6
| 303693 ||  || — || July 12, 2005 || Bergisch Gladbac || W. Bickel || — || align=right | 3.2 km || 
|-id=694 bgcolor=#d6d6d6
| 303694 ||  || — || July 7, 2005 || Mauna Kea || C. Veillet || — || align=right | 2.7 km || 
|-id=695 bgcolor=#d6d6d6
| 303695 ||  || — || July 27, 2005 || Palomar || NEAT || — || align=right | 4.3 km || 
|-id=696 bgcolor=#d6d6d6
| 303696 ||  || — || July 29, 2005 || Palomar || NEAT || — || align=right | 3.7 km || 
|-id=697 bgcolor=#d6d6d6
| 303697 ||  || — || July 29, 2005 || Palomar || NEAT || — || align=right | 2.7 km || 
|-id=698 bgcolor=#d6d6d6
| 303698 ||  || — || July 30, 2005 || Palomar || NEAT || — || align=right | 3.4 km || 
|-id=699 bgcolor=#d6d6d6
| 303699 ||  || — || July 29, 2005 || Palomar || NEAT || THM || align=right | 2.6 km || 
|-id=700 bgcolor=#d6d6d6
| 303700 ||  || — || July 30, 2005 || Palomar || NEAT || — || align=right | 2.8 km || 
|}

303701–303800 

|-bgcolor=#d6d6d6
| 303701 ||  || — || July 29, 2005 || Siding Spring || SSS || — || align=right | 4.4 km || 
|-id=702 bgcolor=#E9E9E9
| 303702 ||  || — || July 30, 2005 || Palomar || NEAT || — || align=right | 3.4 km || 
|-id=703 bgcolor=#d6d6d6
| 303703 ||  || — || July 31, 2005 || Palomar || NEAT || — || align=right | 2.7 km || 
|-id=704 bgcolor=#d6d6d6
| 303704 ||  || — || July 31, 2005 || Palomar || NEAT || EOS || align=right | 2.2 km || 
|-id=705 bgcolor=#d6d6d6
| 303705 ||  || — || July 27, 2005 || Palomar || NEAT || EOS || align=right | 2.3 km || 
|-id=706 bgcolor=#d6d6d6
| 303706 ||  || — || July 29, 2005 || Palomar || NEAT || — || align=right | 3.3 km || 
|-id=707 bgcolor=#d6d6d6
| 303707 ||  || — || August 1, 2005 || Siding Spring || SSS || HYG || align=right | 3.1 km || 
|-id=708 bgcolor=#d6d6d6
| 303708 ||  || — || August 1, 2005 || Siding Spring || SSS || — || align=right | 3.3 km || 
|-id=709 bgcolor=#d6d6d6
| 303709 ||  || — || August 4, 2005 || Palomar || NEAT || — || align=right | 2.8 km || 
|-id=710 bgcolor=#d6d6d6
| 303710 Velpeau ||  ||  || August 9, 2005 || Saint-Sulpice || B. Christophe || — || align=right | 3.6 km || 
|-id=711 bgcolor=#d6d6d6
| 303711 ||  || — || August 11, 2005 || Pla D'Arguines || R. Ferrando, M. Ferrando || — || align=right | 2.6 km || 
|-id=712 bgcolor=#C2E0FF
| 303712 ||  || — || August 9, 2005 || Cerro Tololo || Cerro Tololo Obs. || cubewano (cold)moon || align=right | 238 km || 
|-id=713 bgcolor=#d6d6d6
| 303713 ||  || — || August 5, 2005 || Palomar || NEAT || — || align=right | 3.3 km || 
|-id=714 bgcolor=#d6d6d6
| 303714 ||  || — || August 24, 2005 || Palomar || NEAT || — || align=right | 3.9 km || 
|-id=715 bgcolor=#d6d6d6
| 303715 ||  || — || August 24, 2005 || Palomar || NEAT || — || align=right | 3.4 km || 
|-id=716 bgcolor=#d6d6d6
| 303716 ||  || — || August 24, 2005 || Palomar || NEAT || — || align=right | 4.0 km || 
|-id=717 bgcolor=#d6d6d6
| 303717 ||  || — || August 25, 2005 || Palomar || NEAT || — || align=right | 3.7 km || 
|-id=718 bgcolor=#d6d6d6
| 303718 ||  || — || August 24, 2005 || Palomar || NEAT || — || align=right | 3.3 km || 
|-id=719 bgcolor=#d6d6d6
| 303719 ||  || — || August 24, 2005 || Palomar || NEAT || TIR || align=right | 4.1 km || 
|-id=720 bgcolor=#d6d6d6
| 303720 ||  || — || August 25, 2005 || Palomar || NEAT || — || align=right | 4.0 km || 
|-id=721 bgcolor=#d6d6d6
| 303721 ||  || — || August 25, 2005 || Palomar || NEAT || EOS || align=right | 2.3 km || 
|-id=722 bgcolor=#d6d6d6
| 303722 ||  || — || August 25, 2005 || Palomar || NEAT || — || align=right | 4.4 km || 
|-id=723 bgcolor=#d6d6d6
| 303723 ||  || — || August 25, 2005 || Palomar || NEAT || — || align=right | 3.7 km || 
|-id=724 bgcolor=#d6d6d6
| 303724 ||  || — || August 27, 2005 || Kitt Peak || Spacewatch || — || align=right | 3.5 km || 
|-id=725 bgcolor=#d6d6d6
| 303725 ||  || — || August 25, 2005 || Palomar || NEAT || URS || align=right | 4.4 km || 
|-id=726 bgcolor=#d6d6d6
| 303726 ||  || — || August 25, 2005 || Palomar || NEAT || — || align=right | 5.3 km || 
|-id=727 bgcolor=#d6d6d6
| 303727 ||  || — || August 25, 2005 || Campo Imperatore || CINEOS || — || align=right | 4.1 km || 
|-id=728 bgcolor=#d6d6d6
| 303728 ||  || — || August 25, 2005 || Campo Imperatore || CINEOS || — || align=right | 5.2 km || 
|-id=729 bgcolor=#d6d6d6
| 303729 ||  || — || August 26, 2005 || Palomar || NEAT || — || align=right | 3.8 km || 
|-id=730 bgcolor=#d6d6d6
| 303730 ||  || — || August 26, 2005 || Palomar || NEAT || — || align=right | 4.2 km || 
|-id=731 bgcolor=#d6d6d6
| 303731 ||  || — || August 28, 2005 || Kitt Peak || Spacewatch || HYG || align=right | 3.0 km || 
|-id=732 bgcolor=#d6d6d6
| 303732 ||  || — || August 28, 2005 || Kitt Peak || Spacewatch || — || align=right | 4.0 km || 
|-id=733 bgcolor=#d6d6d6
| 303733 ||  || — || August 24, 2005 || Palomar || NEAT || — || align=right | 4.3 km || 
|-id=734 bgcolor=#d6d6d6
| 303734 ||  || — || August 26, 2005 || Palomar || NEAT || — || align=right | 3.1 km || 
|-id=735 bgcolor=#d6d6d6
| 303735 ||  || — || August 26, 2005 || Palomar || NEAT || EOS || align=right | 2.6 km || 
|-id=736 bgcolor=#d6d6d6
| 303736 ||  || — || August 26, 2005 || Palomar || NEAT || — || align=right | 3.9 km || 
|-id=737 bgcolor=#d6d6d6
| 303737 ||  || — || August 27, 2005 || Anderson Mesa || LONEOS || THM || align=right | 3.2 km || 
|-id=738 bgcolor=#d6d6d6
| 303738 ||  || — || August 28, 2005 || Siding Spring || SSS || — || align=right | 3.6 km || 
|-id=739 bgcolor=#d6d6d6
| 303739 ||  || — || August 28, 2005 || Siding Spring || SSS || TEL || align=right | 2.1 km || 
|-id=740 bgcolor=#d6d6d6
| 303740 ||  || — || August 26, 2005 || Haleakala || NEAT || MEL || align=right | 5.4 km || 
|-id=741 bgcolor=#d6d6d6
| 303741 ||  || — || August 29, 2005 || Anderson Mesa || LONEOS || — || align=right | 3.5 km || 
|-id=742 bgcolor=#d6d6d6
| 303742 ||  || — || August 30, 2005 || Drebach || Drebach Obs. || — || align=right | 3.5 km || 
|-id=743 bgcolor=#d6d6d6
| 303743 ||  || — || August 29, 2005 || Goodricke-Pigott || R. A. Tucker || TIR || align=right | 3.8 km || 
|-id=744 bgcolor=#fefefe
| 303744 ||  || — || August 31, 2005 || Palomar || NEAT || H || align=right data-sort-value="0.85" | 850 m || 
|-id=745 bgcolor=#d6d6d6
| 303745 ||  || — || August 26, 2005 || Anderson Mesa || LONEOS || — || align=right | 3.5 km || 
|-id=746 bgcolor=#d6d6d6
| 303746 ||  || — || August 27, 2005 || Palomar || NEAT || — || align=right | 4.7 km || 
|-id=747 bgcolor=#d6d6d6
| 303747 ||  || — || August 27, 2005 || Palomar || NEAT || — || align=right | 3.9 km || 
|-id=748 bgcolor=#d6d6d6
| 303748 ||  || — || August 27, 2005 || Palomar || NEAT || HYG || align=right | 3.3 km || 
|-id=749 bgcolor=#d6d6d6
| 303749 ||  || — || August 27, 2005 || Palomar || NEAT || — || align=right | 3.7 km || 
|-id=750 bgcolor=#d6d6d6
| 303750 ||  || — || August 27, 2005 || Palomar || NEAT || — || align=right | 3.1 km || 
|-id=751 bgcolor=#d6d6d6
| 303751 ||  || — || August 27, 2005 || Palomar || NEAT || HYG || align=right | 3.6 km || 
|-id=752 bgcolor=#d6d6d6
| 303752 ||  || — || August 28, 2005 || Kitt Peak || Spacewatch || — || align=right | 2.4 km || 
|-id=753 bgcolor=#d6d6d6
| 303753 ||  || — || August 28, 2005 || Kitt Peak || Spacewatch || — || align=right | 2.5 km || 
|-id=754 bgcolor=#d6d6d6
| 303754 ||  || — || August 28, 2005 || Kitt Peak || Spacewatch || THM || align=right | 2.3 km || 
|-id=755 bgcolor=#d6d6d6
| 303755 ||  || — || August 28, 2005 || Kitt Peak || Spacewatch || THM || align=right | 2.7 km || 
|-id=756 bgcolor=#d6d6d6
| 303756 ||  || — || August 28, 2005 || Kitt Peak || Spacewatch || EOS || align=right | 2.0 km || 
|-id=757 bgcolor=#d6d6d6
| 303757 ||  || — || August 28, 2005 || Kitt Peak || Spacewatch || — || align=right | 3.2 km || 
|-id=758 bgcolor=#d6d6d6
| 303758 ||  || — || August 28, 2005 || Kitt Peak || Spacewatch || — || align=right | 5.1 km || 
|-id=759 bgcolor=#d6d6d6
| 303759 ||  || — || August 28, 2005 || Kitt Peak || Spacewatch || — || align=right | 2.5 km || 
|-id=760 bgcolor=#d6d6d6
| 303760 ||  || — || August 29, 2005 || Kitt Peak || Spacewatch || — || align=right | 2.9 km || 
|-id=761 bgcolor=#d6d6d6
| 303761 ||  || — || August 30, 2005 || Anderson Mesa || LONEOS || — || align=right | 3.6 km || 
|-id=762 bgcolor=#d6d6d6
| 303762 ||  || — || August 30, 2005 || Anderson Mesa || LONEOS || EUP || align=right | 4.3 km || 
|-id=763 bgcolor=#d6d6d6
| 303763 ||  || — || August 26, 2005 || Palomar || NEAT || — || align=right | 3.4 km || 
|-id=764 bgcolor=#d6d6d6
| 303764 ||  || — || August 28, 2005 || Kitt Peak || Spacewatch || — || align=right | 4.0 km || 
|-id=765 bgcolor=#d6d6d6
| 303765 ||  || — || August 30, 2005 || Kitt Peak || Spacewatch || — || align=right | 3.5 km || 
|-id=766 bgcolor=#d6d6d6
| 303766 ||  || — || August 29, 2005 || Palomar || NEAT || — || align=right | 3.9 km || 
|-id=767 bgcolor=#d6d6d6
| 303767 ||  || — || August 29, 2005 || Palomar || NEAT || VER || align=right | 4.3 km || 
|-id=768 bgcolor=#d6d6d6
| 303768 ||  || — || August 29, 2005 || Palomar || NEAT || VER || align=right | 3.2 km || 
|-id=769 bgcolor=#d6d6d6
| 303769 ||  || — || August 29, 2005 || Palomar || NEAT || — || align=right | 4.1 km || 
|-id=770 bgcolor=#d6d6d6
| 303770 ||  || — || August 29, 2005 || Palomar || NEAT || HYG || align=right | 3.8 km || 
|-id=771 bgcolor=#d6d6d6
| 303771 ||  || — || August 29, 2005 || Palomar || NEAT || VER || align=right | 4.4 km || 
|-id=772 bgcolor=#d6d6d6
| 303772 ||  || — || August 31, 2005 || Anderson Mesa || LONEOS || LIX || align=right | 4.1 km || 
|-id=773 bgcolor=#d6d6d6
| 303773 ||  || — || August 31, 2005 || Anderson Mesa || LONEOS || — || align=right | 4.1 km || 
|-id=774 bgcolor=#d6d6d6
| 303774 ||  || — || August 27, 2005 || Palomar || NEAT || — || align=right | 4.1 km || 
|-id=775 bgcolor=#C2E0FF
| 303775 ||  || — || August 30, 2005 || Palomar || Palomar Obs. || SDO || align=right | 766 km || 
|-id=776 bgcolor=#d6d6d6
| 303776 ||  || — || August 30, 2005 || Palomar || NEAT || — || align=right | 2.4 km || 
|-id=777 bgcolor=#d6d6d6
| 303777 ||  || — || August 27, 2005 || Palomar || NEAT || EUP || align=right | 6.2 km || 
|-id=778 bgcolor=#d6d6d6
| 303778 ||  || — || August 27, 2005 || Palomar || NEAT || HYG || align=right | 2.8 km || 
|-id=779 bgcolor=#d6d6d6
| 303779 ||  || — || August 29, 2005 || Kitt Peak || Spacewatch || — || align=right | 3.1 km || 
|-id=780 bgcolor=#d6d6d6
| 303780 ||  || — || August 26, 2005 || Palomar || NEAT || HYG || align=right | 3.7 km || 
|-id=781 bgcolor=#d6d6d6
| 303781 ||  || — || September 1, 2005 || St. Véran || Saint-Véran Obs. || HYG || align=right | 3.0 km || 
|-id=782 bgcolor=#d6d6d6
| 303782 ||  || — || September 1, 2005 || Kitt Peak || Spacewatch || — || align=right | 2.6 km || 
|-id=783 bgcolor=#d6d6d6
| 303783 ||  || — || September 1, 2005 || Palomar || NEAT || URS || align=right | 5.1 km || 
|-id=784 bgcolor=#d6d6d6
| 303784 ||  || — || September 6, 2005 || Anderson Mesa || LONEOS || — || align=right | 5.3 km || 
|-id=785 bgcolor=#d6d6d6
| 303785 ||  || — || September 14, 2005 || Siding Spring || SSS || — || align=right | 4.9 km || 
|-id=786 bgcolor=#d6d6d6
| 303786 ||  || — || September 3, 2005 || Mauna Kea || C. Veillet || — || align=right | 3.0 km || 
|-id=787 bgcolor=#d6d6d6
| 303787 ||  || — || September 12, 2005 || Kitt Peak || Spacewatch || VER || align=right | 3.7 km || 
|-id=788 bgcolor=#d6d6d6
| 303788 ||  || — || September 13, 2005 || Kitt Peak || Spacewatch || — || align=right | 3.0 km || 
|-id=789 bgcolor=#d6d6d6
| 303789 ||  || — || September 13, 2005 || Socorro || LINEAR || MEL || align=right | 4.8 km || 
|-id=790 bgcolor=#d6d6d6
| 303790 ||  || — || September 14, 2005 || Apache Point || A. C. Becker || — || align=right | 3.9 km || 
|-id=791 bgcolor=#d6d6d6
| 303791 ||  || — || September 24, 2005 || Kitt Peak || Spacewatch || — || align=right | 2.8 km || 
|-id=792 bgcolor=#d6d6d6
| 303792 ||  || — || September 25, 2005 || Catalina || CSS || — || align=right | 4.8 km || 
|-id=793 bgcolor=#d6d6d6
| 303793 ||  || — || September 24, 2005 || Anderson Mesa || LONEOS || — || align=right | 6.4 km || 
|-id=794 bgcolor=#d6d6d6
| 303794 ||  || — || September 24, 2005 || Anderson Mesa || LONEOS || THB || align=right | 3.8 km || 
|-id=795 bgcolor=#d6d6d6
| 303795 ||  || — || September 23, 2005 || Kitt Peak || Spacewatch || VER || align=right | 3.9 km || 
|-id=796 bgcolor=#d6d6d6
| 303796 ||  || — || September 23, 2005 || Kitt Peak || Spacewatch || VER || align=right | 3.2 km || 
|-id=797 bgcolor=#d6d6d6
| 303797 ||  || — || September 23, 2005 || Kitt Peak || Spacewatch || HYG || align=right | 3.5 km || 
|-id=798 bgcolor=#d6d6d6
| 303798 ||  || — || September 23, 2005 || Kitt Peak || Spacewatch || — || align=right | 3.5 km || 
|-id=799 bgcolor=#d6d6d6
| 303799 ||  || — || September 24, 2005 || Kitt Peak || Spacewatch || TIR || align=right | 4.3 km || 
|-id=800 bgcolor=#d6d6d6
| 303800 ||  || — || September 24, 2005 || Kitt Peak || Spacewatch || HYG || align=right | 3.3 km || 
|}

303801–303900 

|-bgcolor=#d6d6d6
| 303801 ||  || — || September 24, 2005 || Kitt Peak || Spacewatch || — || align=right | 3.2 km || 
|-id=802 bgcolor=#d6d6d6
| 303802 ||  || — || September 24, 2005 || Kitt Peak || Spacewatch || — || align=right | 4.6 km || 
|-id=803 bgcolor=#d6d6d6
| 303803 ||  || — || September 24, 2005 || Kitt Peak || Spacewatch || — || align=right | 3.4 km || 
|-id=804 bgcolor=#d6d6d6
| 303804 ||  || — || September 24, 2005 || Kitt Peak || Spacewatch || — || align=right | 3.1 km || 
|-id=805 bgcolor=#d6d6d6
| 303805 ||  || — || September 24, 2005 || Kitt Peak || Spacewatch || — || align=right | 2.6 km || 
|-id=806 bgcolor=#d6d6d6
| 303806 ||  || — || September 24, 2005 || Kitt Peak || Spacewatch || URS || align=right | 3.8 km || 
|-id=807 bgcolor=#d6d6d6
| 303807 ||  || — || September 26, 2005 || Kitt Peak || Spacewatch || — || align=right | 5.1 km || 
|-id=808 bgcolor=#d6d6d6
| 303808 ||  || — || September 26, 2005 || Kitt Peak || Spacewatch || Tj (2.93) || align=right | 4.7 km || 
|-id=809 bgcolor=#d6d6d6
| 303809 ||  || — || September 26, 2005 || Palomar || NEAT || VER || align=right | 3.6 km || 
|-id=810 bgcolor=#d6d6d6
| 303810 ||  || — || September 26, 2005 || Palomar || NEAT || — || align=right | 5.3 km || 
|-id=811 bgcolor=#d6d6d6
| 303811 ||  || — || September 27, 2005 || Kitt Peak || Spacewatch || — || align=right | 3.9 km || 
|-id=812 bgcolor=#d6d6d6
| 303812 ||  || — || September 24, 2005 || Kitt Peak || Spacewatch || — || align=right | 3.2 km || 
|-id=813 bgcolor=#d6d6d6
| 303813 ||  || — || September 24, 2005 || Kitt Peak || Spacewatch || — || align=right | 3.1 km || 
|-id=814 bgcolor=#d6d6d6
| 303814 ||  || — || September 24, 2005 || Kitt Peak || Spacewatch || THM || align=right | 2.5 km || 
|-id=815 bgcolor=#d6d6d6
| 303815 ||  || — || September 24, 2005 || Kitt Peak || Spacewatch || 637 || align=right | 2.9 km || 
|-id=816 bgcolor=#d6d6d6
| 303816 ||  || — || September 24, 2005 || Kitt Peak || Spacewatch || — || align=right | 3.3 km || 
|-id=817 bgcolor=#d6d6d6
| 303817 ||  || — || September 24, 2005 || Kitt Peak || Spacewatch || — || align=right | 3.9 km || 
|-id=818 bgcolor=#d6d6d6
| 303818 ||  || — || September 24, 2005 || Kitt Peak || Spacewatch || — || align=right | 3.4 km || 
|-id=819 bgcolor=#d6d6d6
| 303819 ||  || — || September 25, 2005 || Palomar || NEAT || URS || align=right | 5.1 km || 
|-id=820 bgcolor=#d6d6d6
| 303820 ||  || — || September 25, 2005 || Kitt Peak || Spacewatch || THB || align=right | 3.6 km || 
|-id=821 bgcolor=#d6d6d6
| 303821 ||  || — || September 25, 2005 || Catalina || CSS || — || align=right | 3.6 km || 
|-id=822 bgcolor=#d6d6d6
| 303822 ||  || — || September 26, 2005 || Kitt Peak || Spacewatch || EOS || align=right | 3.0 km || 
|-id=823 bgcolor=#d6d6d6
| 303823 ||  || — || September 26, 2005 || Palomar || NEAT || — || align=right | 3.6 km || 
|-id=824 bgcolor=#d6d6d6
| 303824 ||  || — || September 26, 2005 || Palomar || NEAT || — || align=right | 4.4 km || 
|-id=825 bgcolor=#d6d6d6
| 303825 ||  || — || September 27, 2005 || Kitt Peak || Spacewatch || — || align=right | 4.0 km || 
|-id=826 bgcolor=#d6d6d6
| 303826 ||  || — || September 28, 2005 || Palomar || NEAT || — || align=right | 4.7 km || 
|-id=827 bgcolor=#d6d6d6
| 303827 ||  || — || September 29, 2005 || Catalina || CSS || — || align=right | 5.1 km || 
|-id=828 bgcolor=#d6d6d6
| 303828 ||  || — || September 29, 2005 || Kitt Peak || Spacewatch || — || align=right | 3.2 km || 
|-id=829 bgcolor=#d6d6d6
| 303829 ||  || — || September 29, 2005 || Anderson Mesa || LONEOS || — || align=right | 3.0 km || 
|-id=830 bgcolor=#d6d6d6
| 303830 ||  || — || September 29, 2005 || Anderson Mesa || LONEOS || 7:4 || align=right | 5.1 km || 
|-id=831 bgcolor=#d6d6d6
| 303831 ||  || — || September 29, 2005 || Mount Lemmon || Mount Lemmon Survey || — || align=right | 3.1 km || 
|-id=832 bgcolor=#d6d6d6
| 303832 ||  || — || September 29, 2005 || Anderson Mesa || LONEOS || THB || align=right | 3.8 km || 
|-id=833 bgcolor=#d6d6d6
| 303833 ||  || — || September 25, 2005 || Kitt Peak || Spacewatch || — || align=right | 5.1 km || 
|-id=834 bgcolor=#d6d6d6
| 303834 ||  || — || September 25, 2005 || Kitt Peak || Spacewatch || — || align=right | 4.2 km || 
|-id=835 bgcolor=#d6d6d6
| 303835 ||  || — || September 25, 2005 || Kitt Peak || Spacewatch || HYG || align=right | 3.0 km || 
|-id=836 bgcolor=#d6d6d6
| 303836 ||  || — || September 26, 2005 || Kitt Peak || Spacewatch || EOS || align=right | 2.3 km || 
|-id=837 bgcolor=#d6d6d6
| 303837 ||  || — || September 27, 2005 || Kitt Peak || Spacewatch || — || align=right | 3.7 km || 
|-id=838 bgcolor=#d6d6d6
| 303838 ||  || — || September 27, 2005 || Kitt Peak || Spacewatch || — || align=right | 3.4 km || 
|-id=839 bgcolor=#d6d6d6
| 303839 ||  || — || September 27, 2005 || Palomar || NEAT || — || align=right | 5.2 km || 
|-id=840 bgcolor=#d6d6d6
| 303840 ||  || — || September 29, 2005 || Kitt Peak || Spacewatch || — || align=right | 2.8 km || 
|-id=841 bgcolor=#d6d6d6
| 303841 ||  || — || September 29, 2005 || Anderson Mesa || LONEOS || — || align=right | 5.5 km || 
|-id=842 bgcolor=#d6d6d6
| 303842 ||  || — || September 29, 2005 || Kitt Peak || Spacewatch || — || align=right | 3.5 km || 
|-id=843 bgcolor=#d6d6d6
| 303843 ||  || — || September 29, 2005 || Kitt Peak || Spacewatch || THM || align=right | 2.5 km || 
|-id=844 bgcolor=#d6d6d6
| 303844 ||  || — || September 29, 2005 || Kitt Peak || Spacewatch || — || align=right | 4.8 km || 
|-id=845 bgcolor=#d6d6d6
| 303845 ||  || — || September 29, 2005 || Kitt Peak || Spacewatch || — || align=right | 3.4 km || 
|-id=846 bgcolor=#d6d6d6
| 303846 ||  || — || September 29, 2005 || Kitt Peak || Spacewatch || — || align=right | 4.6 km || 
|-id=847 bgcolor=#d6d6d6
| 303847 ||  || — || September 29, 2005 || Mount Lemmon || Mount Lemmon Survey || THM || align=right | 2.9 km || 
|-id=848 bgcolor=#d6d6d6
| 303848 ||  || — || September 29, 2005 || Mount Lemmon || Mount Lemmon Survey || — || align=right | 3.6 km || 
|-id=849 bgcolor=#d6d6d6
| 303849 ||  || — || September 29, 2005 || Mount Lemmon || Mount Lemmon Survey || — || align=right | 2.7 km || 
|-id=850 bgcolor=#d6d6d6
| 303850 ||  || — || September 29, 2005 || Kitt Peak || Spacewatch || 7:4 || align=right | 4.4 km || 
|-id=851 bgcolor=#d6d6d6
| 303851 ||  || — || September 30, 2005 || Kitt Peak || Spacewatch || — || align=right | 3.9 km || 
|-id=852 bgcolor=#d6d6d6
| 303852 ||  || — || September 30, 2005 || Kitt Peak || Spacewatch || — || align=right | 2.9 km || 
|-id=853 bgcolor=#d6d6d6
| 303853 ||  || — || September 30, 2005 || Kitt Peak || Spacewatch || — || align=right | 2.6 km || 
|-id=854 bgcolor=#d6d6d6
| 303854 ||  || — || September 30, 2005 || Mount Lemmon || Mount Lemmon Survey || — || align=right | 2.9 km || 
|-id=855 bgcolor=#d6d6d6
| 303855 ||  || — || September 30, 2005 || Anderson Mesa || LONEOS || — || align=right | 4.5 km || 
|-id=856 bgcolor=#d6d6d6
| 303856 ||  || — || September 30, 2005 || Palomar || NEAT || HYG || align=right | 3.8 km || 
|-id=857 bgcolor=#d6d6d6
| 303857 ||  || — || September 30, 2005 || Kitt Peak || Spacewatch || ALA || align=right | 4.5 km || 
|-id=858 bgcolor=#d6d6d6
| 303858 ||  || — || September 30, 2005 || Mount Lemmon || Mount Lemmon Survey || — || align=right | 2.9 km || 
|-id=859 bgcolor=#d6d6d6
| 303859 ||  || — || September 30, 2005 || Anderson Mesa || LONEOS || — || align=right | 4.0 km || 
|-id=860 bgcolor=#d6d6d6
| 303860 ||  || — || September 30, 2005 || Kitt Peak || Spacewatch || — || align=right | 4.1 km || 
|-id=861 bgcolor=#d6d6d6
| 303861 ||  || — || September 23, 2005 || Catalina || CSS || — || align=right | 3.7 km || 
|-id=862 bgcolor=#d6d6d6
| 303862 ||  || — || September 22, 2005 || Palomar || NEAT || — || align=right | 4.6 km || 
|-id=863 bgcolor=#d6d6d6
| 303863 ||  || — || September 22, 2005 || Palomar || NEAT || EOS || align=right | 2.2 km || 
|-id=864 bgcolor=#d6d6d6
| 303864 ||  || — || September 25, 2005 || Palomar || NEAT || EUP || align=right | 3.8 km || 
|-id=865 bgcolor=#d6d6d6
| 303865 ||  || — || September 25, 2005 || Kitt Peak || Spacewatch || — || align=right | 5.7 km || 
|-id=866 bgcolor=#d6d6d6
| 303866 ||  || — || September 27, 2005 || Kitt Peak || Spacewatch || — || align=right | 4.9 km || 
|-id=867 bgcolor=#d6d6d6
| 303867 ||  || — || September 25, 2005 || Apache Point || A. C. Becker || — || align=right | 3.0 km || 
|-id=868 bgcolor=#d6d6d6
| 303868 ||  || — || September 26, 2005 || Apache Point || A. C. Becker || THM || align=right | 2.4 km || 
|-id=869 bgcolor=#d6d6d6
| 303869 ||  || — || September 25, 2005 || Palomar || NEAT || — || align=right | 4.1 km || 
|-id=870 bgcolor=#d6d6d6
| 303870 ||  || — || September 22, 2005 || Palomar || NEAT || HYG || align=right | 3.4 km || 
|-id=871 bgcolor=#d6d6d6
| 303871 ||  || — || October 1, 2005 || Catalina || CSS || URS || align=right | 4.6 km || 
|-id=872 bgcolor=#d6d6d6
| 303872 ||  || — || October 2, 2005 || Palomar || NEAT || — || align=right | 4.6 km || 
|-id=873 bgcolor=#d6d6d6
| 303873 ||  || — || October 1, 2005 || Kitt Peak || Spacewatch || ELF || align=right | 4.4 km || 
|-id=874 bgcolor=#d6d6d6
| 303874 ||  || — || October 1, 2005 || Catalina || CSS || — || align=right | 3.9 km || 
|-id=875 bgcolor=#d6d6d6
| 303875 ||  || — || October 1, 2005 || Catalina || CSS || EOS || align=right | 2.7 km || 
|-id=876 bgcolor=#d6d6d6
| 303876 ||  || — || October 1, 2005 || Mount Lemmon || Mount Lemmon Survey || HYG || align=right | 3.2 km || 
|-id=877 bgcolor=#d6d6d6
| 303877 ||  || — || October 1, 2005 || Mount Lemmon || Mount Lemmon Survey || — || align=right | 3.0 km || 
|-id=878 bgcolor=#d6d6d6
| 303878 ||  || — || October 1, 2005 || Kitt Peak || Spacewatch || — || align=right | 3.2 km || 
|-id=879 bgcolor=#d6d6d6
| 303879 ||  || — || October 3, 2005 || Catalina || CSS || — || align=right | 3.7 km || 
|-id=880 bgcolor=#d6d6d6
| 303880 ||  || — || October 3, 2005 || Catalina || CSS || EOS || align=right | 2.3 km || 
|-id=881 bgcolor=#d6d6d6
| 303881 ||  || — || October 3, 2005 || Kitt Peak || Spacewatch || — || align=right | 3.5 km || 
|-id=882 bgcolor=#d6d6d6
| 303882 ||  || — || October 3, 2005 || Kitt Peak || Spacewatch || — || align=right | 3.5 km || 
|-id=883 bgcolor=#d6d6d6
| 303883 ||  || — || October 6, 2005 || Mount Lemmon || Mount Lemmon Survey || — || align=right | 3.0 km || 
|-id=884 bgcolor=#d6d6d6
| 303884 ||  || — || October 6, 2005 || Kitt Peak || Spacewatch || — || align=right | 4.5 km || 
|-id=885 bgcolor=#d6d6d6
| 303885 ||  || — || October 7, 2005 || Mount Lemmon || Mount Lemmon Survey || — || align=right | 4.8 km || 
|-id=886 bgcolor=#d6d6d6
| 303886 ||  || — || October 7, 2005 || Mount Lemmon || Mount Lemmon Survey || — || align=right | 3.9 km || 
|-id=887 bgcolor=#d6d6d6
| 303887 ||  || — || October 1, 2005 || Catalina || CSS || — || align=right | 4.3 km || 
|-id=888 bgcolor=#d6d6d6
| 303888 ||  || — || October 5, 2005 || Kitt Peak || Spacewatch || EOS || align=right | 2.4 km || 
|-id=889 bgcolor=#d6d6d6
| 303889 ||  || — || October 5, 2005 || Mount Lemmon || Mount Lemmon Survey || — || align=right | 5.6 km || 
|-id=890 bgcolor=#d6d6d6
| 303890 ||  || — || October 6, 2005 || Kitt Peak || Spacewatch || — || align=right | 2.9 km || 
|-id=891 bgcolor=#d6d6d6
| 303891 ||  || — || October 6, 2005 || Mount Lemmon || Mount Lemmon Survey || HYG || align=right | 2.9 km || 
|-id=892 bgcolor=#d6d6d6
| 303892 ||  || — || October 7, 2005 || Kitt Peak || Spacewatch || — || align=right | 3.6 km || 
|-id=893 bgcolor=#d6d6d6
| 303893 ||  || — || October 7, 2005 || Mount Lemmon || Mount Lemmon Survey || — || align=right | 3.3 km || 
|-id=894 bgcolor=#d6d6d6
| 303894 ||  || — || October 7, 2005 || Mount Lemmon || Mount Lemmon Survey || — || align=right | 3.5 km || 
|-id=895 bgcolor=#d6d6d6
| 303895 ||  || — || October 8, 2005 || Socorro || LINEAR || VER || align=right | 4.1 km || 
|-id=896 bgcolor=#d6d6d6
| 303896 ||  || — || October 7, 2005 || Kitt Peak || Spacewatch || — || align=right | 3.2 km || 
|-id=897 bgcolor=#d6d6d6
| 303897 ||  || — || October 7, 2005 || Kitt Peak || Spacewatch || HYG || align=right | 2.9 km || 
|-id=898 bgcolor=#d6d6d6
| 303898 ||  || — || October 7, 2005 || Kitt Peak || Spacewatch || EUP || align=right | 5.7 km || 
|-id=899 bgcolor=#d6d6d6
| 303899 ||  || — || October 7, 2005 || Kitt Peak || Spacewatch || VER || align=right | 3.2 km || 
|-id=900 bgcolor=#d6d6d6
| 303900 ||  || — || October 7, 2005 || Kitt Peak || Spacewatch || — || align=right | 2.9 km || 
|}

303901–304000 

|-bgcolor=#d6d6d6
| 303901 ||  || — || October 7, 2005 || Catalina || CSS || — || align=right | 3.3 km || 
|-id=902 bgcolor=#d6d6d6
| 303902 ||  || — || October 8, 2005 || Kitt Peak || Spacewatch || — || align=right | 3.5 km || 
|-id=903 bgcolor=#d6d6d6
| 303903 ||  || — || October 8, 2005 || Kitt Peak || Spacewatch || — || align=right | 4.1 km || 
|-id=904 bgcolor=#d6d6d6
| 303904 ||  || — || October 8, 2005 || Kitt Peak || Spacewatch || — || align=right | 2.8 km || 
|-id=905 bgcolor=#d6d6d6
| 303905 ||  || — || October 5, 2005 || Catalina || CSS || — || align=right | 3.6 km || 
|-id=906 bgcolor=#d6d6d6
| 303906 ||  || — || October 9, 2005 || Kitt Peak || Spacewatch || — || align=right | 3.1 km || 
|-id=907 bgcolor=#d6d6d6
| 303907 ||  || — || October 9, 2005 || Kitt Peak || Spacewatch || — || align=right | 4.1 km || 
|-id=908 bgcolor=#d6d6d6
| 303908 ||  || — || October 9, 2005 || Kitt Peak || Spacewatch || — || align=right | 3.2 km || 
|-id=909 bgcolor=#d6d6d6
| 303909 Tomknops ||  ||  || October 11, 2005 || Uccle || P. De Cat || EOS || align=right | 2.4 km || 
|-id=910 bgcolor=#d6d6d6
| 303910 ||  || — || October 1, 2005 || Kitt Peak || Spacewatch || HYG || align=right | 3.3 km || 
|-id=911 bgcolor=#d6d6d6
| 303911 ||  || — || October 23, 2005 || Kitt Peak || Spacewatch || — || align=right | 4.8 km || 
|-id=912 bgcolor=#d6d6d6
| 303912 ||  || — || October 23, 2005 || Kitt Peak || Spacewatch || 7:4 || align=right | 2.6 km || 
|-id=913 bgcolor=#d6d6d6
| 303913 ||  || — || October 23, 2005 || Kitt Peak || Spacewatch || URS || align=right | 4.6 km || 
|-id=914 bgcolor=#d6d6d6
| 303914 ||  || — || October 23, 2005 || Catalina || CSS || — || align=right | 4.6 km || 
|-id=915 bgcolor=#d6d6d6
| 303915 ||  || — || October 21, 2005 || Palomar || NEAT || — || align=right | 4.3 km || 
|-id=916 bgcolor=#fefefe
| 303916 ||  || — || October 24, 2005 || Kitt Peak || Spacewatch || — || align=right data-sort-value="0.73" | 730 m || 
|-id=917 bgcolor=#d6d6d6
| 303917 ||  || — || October 24, 2005 || Kitt Peak || Spacewatch || — || align=right | 3.6 km || 
|-id=918 bgcolor=#d6d6d6
| 303918 ||  || — || October 22, 2005 || Kitt Peak || Spacewatch || THM || align=right | 2.6 km || 
|-id=919 bgcolor=#d6d6d6
| 303919 ||  || — || October 22, 2005 || Kitt Peak || Spacewatch || — || align=right | 3.6 km || 
|-id=920 bgcolor=#fefefe
| 303920 ||  || — || October 25, 2005 || Kitt Peak || Spacewatch || — || align=right data-sort-value="0.55" | 550 m || 
|-id=921 bgcolor=#d6d6d6
| 303921 ||  || — || October 27, 2005 || Kitt Peak || Spacewatch || — || align=right | 2.8 km || 
|-id=922 bgcolor=#d6d6d6
| 303922 ||  || — || October 28, 2005 || Mount Lemmon || Mount Lemmon Survey || — || align=right | 2.9 km || 
|-id=923 bgcolor=#d6d6d6
| 303923 ||  || — || October 24, 2005 || Kitt Peak || Spacewatch || — || align=right | 5.2 km || 
|-id=924 bgcolor=#d6d6d6
| 303924 ||  || — || October 26, 2005 || Kitt Peak || Spacewatch || — || align=right | 4.3 km || 
|-id=925 bgcolor=#d6d6d6
| 303925 ||  || — || October 26, 2005 || Kitt Peak || Spacewatch || 7:4 || align=right | 5.1 km || 
|-id=926 bgcolor=#d6d6d6
| 303926 ||  || — || October 26, 2005 || Kitt Peak || Spacewatch || — || align=right | 4.8 km || 
|-id=927 bgcolor=#d6d6d6
| 303927 ||  || — || October 30, 2005 || Mount Lemmon || Mount Lemmon Survey || THM || align=right | 2.6 km || 
|-id=928 bgcolor=#d6d6d6
| 303928 ||  || — || October 29, 2005 || Catalina || CSS || — || align=right | 5.7 km || 
|-id=929 bgcolor=#d6d6d6
| 303929 ||  || — || October 27, 2005 || Anderson Mesa || LONEOS || — || align=right | 5.0 km || 
|-id=930 bgcolor=#fefefe
| 303930 ||  || — || October 24, 2005 || Mauna Kea || D. J. Tholen || — || align=right data-sort-value="0.98" | 980 m || 
|-id=931 bgcolor=#d6d6d6
| 303931 ||  || — || October 25, 2005 || Apache Point || A. C. Becker || THM || align=right | 1.9 km || 
|-id=932 bgcolor=#d6d6d6
| 303932 ||  || — || October 22, 2005 || Kitt Peak || Spacewatch || — || align=right | 3.1 km || 
|-id=933 bgcolor=#FFC2E0
| 303933 ||  || — || November 3, 2005 || Catalina || CSS || APO || align=right data-sort-value="0.56" | 560 m || 
|-id=934 bgcolor=#d6d6d6
| 303934 ||  || — || November 1, 2005 || Mount Lemmon || Mount Lemmon Survey || URS || align=right | 4.0 km || 
|-id=935 bgcolor=#fefefe
| 303935 ||  || — || November 4, 2005 || Kitt Peak || Spacewatch || — || align=right | 1.5 km || 
|-id=936 bgcolor=#d6d6d6
| 303936 ||  || — || November 1, 2005 || Apache Point || A. C. Becker || HYG || align=right | 3.4 km || 
|-id=937 bgcolor=#d6d6d6
| 303937 ||  || — || November 1, 2005 || Apache Point || A. C. Becker || — || align=right | 4.2 km || 
|-id=938 bgcolor=#d6d6d6
| 303938 ||  || — || November 1, 2005 || Apache Point || A. C. Becker || — || align=right | 3.3 km || 
|-id=939 bgcolor=#d6d6d6
| 303939 ||  || — || November 21, 2005 || Kitt Peak || Spacewatch || 7:4 || align=right | 3.6 km || 
|-id=940 bgcolor=#fefefe
| 303940 ||  || — || November 25, 2005 || Mount Lemmon || Mount Lemmon Survey || — || align=right data-sort-value="0.74" | 740 m || 
|-id=941 bgcolor=#fefefe
| 303941 ||  || — || November 26, 2005 || Mount Lemmon || Mount Lemmon Survey || — || align=right | 1.0 km || 
|-id=942 bgcolor=#d6d6d6
| 303942 ||  || — || November 28, 2005 || Mount Lemmon || Mount Lemmon Survey || — || align=right | 6.8 km || 
|-id=943 bgcolor=#fefefe
| 303943 ||  || — || November 28, 2005 || Mount Lemmon || Mount Lemmon Survey || — || align=right | 1.0 km || 
|-id=944 bgcolor=#d6d6d6
| 303944 ||  || — || November 26, 2005 || Catalina || CSS || Tj (2.89) || align=right | 5.0 km || 
|-id=945 bgcolor=#fefefe
| 303945 ||  || — || November 29, 2005 || Mount Lemmon || Mount Lemmon Survey || — || align=right data-sort-value="0.81" | 810 m || 
|-id=946 bgcolor=#FA8072
| 303946 ||  || — || December 1, 2005 || Socorro || LINEAR || — || align=right | 1.4 km || 
|-id=947 bgcolor=#fefefe
| 303947 ||  || — || December 4, 2005 || Kitt Peak || Spacewatch || — || align=right data-sort-value="0.81" | 810 m || 
|-id=948 bgcolor=#fefefe
| 303948 ||  || — || December 1, 2005 || Kitt Peak || M. W. Buie || NYS || align=right data-sort-value="0.86" | 860 m || 
|-id=949 bgcolor=#fefefe
| 303949 ||  || — || December 6, 2005 || Kitt Peak || Spacewatch || — || align=right data-sort-value="0.98" | 980 m || 
|-id=950 bgcolor=#fefefe
| 303950 ||  || — || December 23, 2005 || Kitt Peak || Spacewatch || — || align=right data-sort-value="0.84" | 840 m || 
|-id=951 bgcolor=#fefefe
| 303951 ||  || — || December 24, 2005 || Kitt Peak || Spacewatch || — || align=right data-sort-value="0.93" | 930 m || 
|-id=952 bgcolor=#fefefe
| 303952 ||  || — || December 25, 2005 || Kitt Peak || Spacewatch || — || align=right data-sort-value="0.65" | 650 m || 
|-id=953 bgcolor=#fefefe
| 303953 ||  || — || December 26, 2005 || Mount Lemmon || Mount Lemmon Survey || FLO || align=right data-sort-value="0.63" | 630 m || 
|-id=954 bgcolor=#fefefe
| 303954 ||  || — || December 24, 2005 || Kitt Peak || Spacewatch || FLO || align=right data-sort-value="0.76" | 760 m || 
|-id=955 bgcolor=#fefefe
| 303955 ||  || — || December 25, 2005 || Mount Lemmon || Mount Lemmon Survey || — || align=right data-sort-value="0.70" | 700 m || 
|-id=956 bgcolor=#fefefe
| 303956 ||  || — || December 26, 2005 || Kitt Peak || Spacewatch || — || align=right data-sort-value="0.65" | 650 m || 
|-id=957 bgcolor=#fefefe
| 303957 ||  || — || December 24, 2005 || Kitt Peak || Spacewatch || — || align=right | 1.5 km || 
|-id=958 bgcolor=#fefefe
| 303958 ||  || — || December 25, 2005 || Mount Lemmon || Mount Lemmon Survey || FLO || align=right data-sort-value="0.77" | 770 m || 
|-id=959 bgcolor=#FA8072
| 303959 ||  || — || December 24, 2005 || Catalina || CSS || — || align=right | 1.2 km || 
|-id=960 bgcolor=#fefefe
| 303960 ||  || — || December 30, 2005 || Kitt Peak || Spacewatch || — || align=right data-sort-value="0.83" | 830 m || 
|-id=961 bgcolor=#fefefe
| 303961 ||  || — || December 24, 2005 || Kitt Peak || Spacewatch || — || align=right data-sort-value="0.58" | 580 m || 
|-id=962 bgcolor=#fefefe
| 303962 ||  || — || December 25, 2005 || Mount Lemmon || Mount Lemmon Survey || — || align=right data-sort-value="0.92" | 920 m || 
|-id=963 bgcolor=#fefefe
| 303963 ||  || — || January 4, 2006 || Catalina || CSS || FLO || align=right data-sort-value="0.93" | 930 m || 
|-id=964 bgcolor=#d6d6d6
| 303964 ||  || — || January 4, 2006 || Catalina || CSS || EUP || align=right | 5.4 km || 
|-id=965 bgcolor=#fefefe
| 303965 ||  || — || January 5, 2006 || Mount Lemmon || Mount Lemmon Survey || FLO || align=right data-sort-value="0.76" | 760 m || 
|-id=966 bgcolor=#fefefe
| 303966 ||  || — || January 7, 2006 || Mount Lemmon || Mount Lemmon Survey || — || align=right data-sort-value="0.89" | 890 m || 
|-id=967 bgcolor=#fefefe
| 303967 ||  || — || January 7, 2006 || Mount Lemmon || Mount Lemmon Survey || — || align=right data-sort-value="0.83" | 830 m || 
|-id=968 bgcolor=#fefefe
| 303968 ||  || — || January 6, 2006 || Anderson Mesa || LONEOS || — || align=right | 1.3 km || 
|-id=969 bgcolor=#fefefe
| 303969 ||  || — || January 5, 2006 || Mount Lemmon || Mount Lemmon Survey || — || align=right data-sort-value="0.85" | 850 m || 
|-id=970 bgcolor=#fefefe
| 303970 ||  || — || January 5, 2006 || Mount Lemmon || Mount Lemmon Survey || — || align=right data-sort-value="0.78" | 780 m || 
|-id=971 bgcolor=#fefefe
| 303971 ||  || — || January 5, 2006 || Mount Lemmon || Mount Lemmon Survey || — || align=right | 1.2 km || 
|-id=972 bgcolor=#fefefe
| 303972 ||  || — || January 21, 2006 || Anderson Mesa || LONEOS || FLO || align=right data-sort-value="0.78" | 780 m || 
|-id=973 bgcolor=#fefefe
| 303973 ||  || — || January 20, 2006 || Kitt Peak || Spacewatch || NYS || align=right data-sort-value="0.97" | 970 m || 
|-id=974 bgcolor=#fefefe
| 303974 ||  || — || January 22, 2006 || Mount Lemmon || Mount Lemmon Survey || — || align=right | 1.1 km || 
|-id=975 bgcolor=#fefefe
| 303975 ||  || — || January 23, 2006 || Mount Lemmon || Mount Lemmon Survey || V || align=right data-sort-value="0.73" | 730 m || 
|-id=976 bgcolor=#fefefe
| 303976 ||  || — || January 23, 2006 || Mount Lemmon || Mount Lemmon Survey || — || align=right | 1.2 km || 
|-id=977 bgcolor=#fefefe
| 303977 ||  || — || January 24, 2006 || Socorro || LINEAR || — || align=right data-sort-value="0.98" | 980 m || 
|-id=978 bgcolor=#fefefe
| 303978 ||  || — || January 23, 2006 || Kitt Peak || Spacewatch || — || align=right data-sort-value="0.77" | 770 m || 
|-id=979 bgcolor=#fefefe
| 303979 ||  || — || January 23, 2006 || Kitt Peak || Spacewatch || — || align=right | 2.6 km || 
|-id=980 bgcolor=#fefefe
| 303980 ||  || — || January 23, 2006 || Kitt Peak || Spacewatch || FLO || align=right | 2.1 km || 
|-id=981 bgcolor=#fefefe
| 303981 ||  || — || January 23, 2006 || Kitt Peak || Spacewatch || — || align=right | 1.2 km || 
|-id=982 bgcolor=#fefefe
| 303982 ||  || — || January 26, 2006 || Kitt Peak || Spacewatch || — || align=right data-sort-value="0.68" | 680 m || 
|-id=983 bgcolor=#fefefe
| 303983 ||  || — || January 26, 2006 || Kitt Peak || Spacewatch || — || align=right | 1.1 km || 
|-id=984 bgcolor=#fefefe
| 303984 ||  || — || January 25, 2006 || Kitt Peak || Spacewatch || — || align=right data-sort-value="0.72" | 720 m || 
|-id=985 bgcolor=#fefefe
| 303985 ||  || — || January 25, 2006 || Kitt Peak || Spacewatch || NYS || align=right data-sort-value="0.66" | 660 m || 
|-id=986 bgcolor=#fefefe
| 303986 ||  || — || January 26, 2006 || Kitt Peak || Spacewatch || — || align=right data-sort-value="0.97" | 970 m || 
|-id=987 bgcolor=#fefefe
| 303987 ||  || — || January 26, 2006 || Kitt Peak || Spacewatch || — || align=right data-sort-value="0.79" | 790 m || 
|-id=988 bgcolor=#fefefe
| 303988 ||  || — || January 26, 2006 || Kitt Peak || Spacewatch || — || align=right data-sort-value="0.85" | 850 m || 
|-id=989 bgcolor=#fefefe
| 303989 ||  || — || January 26, 2006 || Mount Lemmon || Mount Lemmon Survey || — || align=right data-sort-value="0.85" | 850 m || 
|-id=990 bgcolor=#fefefe
| 303990 ||  || — || January 23, 2006 || Kitt Peak || Spacewatch || — || align=right data-sort-value="0.67" | 670 m || 
|-id=991 bgcolor=#fefefe
| 303991 ||  || — || January 25, 2006 || Kitt Peak || Spacewatch || FLO || align=right data-sort-value="0.84" | 840 m || 
|-id=992 bgcolor=#fefefe
| 303992 ||  || — || January 25, 2006 || Kitt Peak || Spacewatch || — || align=right data-sort-value="0.84" | 840 m || 
|-id=993 bgcolor=#fefefe
| 303993 ||  || — || January 26, 2006 || Mount Lemmon || Mount Lemmon Survey || FLO || align=right data-sort-value="0.77" | 770 m || 
|-id=994 bgcolor=#fefefe
| 303994 ||  || — || January 26, 2006 || Kitt Peak || Spacewatch || NYS || align=right data-sort-value="0.90" | 900 m || 
|-id=995 bgcolor=#fefefe
| 303995 ||  || — || January 26, 2006 || Kitt Peak || Spacewatch || V || align=right data-sort-value="0.99" | 990 m || 
|-id=996 bgcolor=#fefefe
| 303996 ||  || — || January 27, 2006 || Kitt Peak || Spacewatch || NYS || align=right data-sort-value="0.69" | 690 m || 
|-id=997 bgcolor=#fefefe
| 303997 ||  || — || January 27, 2006 || Mount Lemmon || Mount Lemmon Survey || — || align=right | 1.2 km || 
|-id=998 bgcolor=#fefefe
| 303998 ||  || — || January 30, 2006 || Kitt Peak || Spacewatch || FLO || align=right data-sort-value="0.60" | 600 m || 
|-id=999 bgcolor=#C2FFFF
| 303999 ||  || — || January 31, 2006 || Kitt Peak || Spacewatch || L5 || align=right | 13 km || 
|-id=000 bgcolor=#fefefe
| 304000 ||  || — || January 31, 2006 || Kitt Peak || Spacewatch || — || align=right data-sort-value="0.79" | 790 m || 
|}

References

External links 
 Discovery Circumstances: Numbered Minor Planets (300001)–(305000) (IAU Minor Planet Center)

0303